= Wolfe-class ship of the line =

Ship of the line class of the Royal Navy

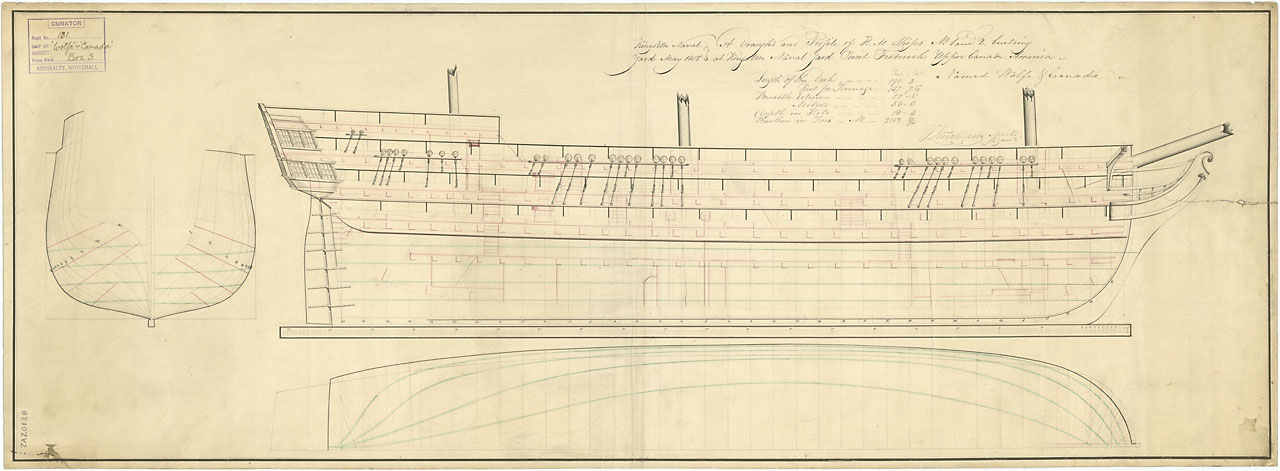
- 1815 lines of Wolfe and Canada

Class overview
- Name: Wolfe-class ship of the line
- Builders: Kingston Royal Naval Dockyard
- Operators: Royal Navy
- Preceded by: HMS St Lawrence
- Built: 1814–1815
- Planned: 2
- Canceled: 2

General characteristics
- Type: First-rate ship of the line
- Tons burthen: 2,152 40/94 (bm)
- Length: 191 ft 3 in (58.3 m) (gundeck); 157 ft 7 5/8 in (48.0 m) (keel)
- Beam: 50 ft 8 in (15.4 m)
- Depth of hold: 18 ft 4 in (5.6 m)
- Propulsion: Sails
- Armament: 36 × 32-pounder long guns; 76 × 24-pounder long guns

The Wolfe-class ship of the line was a 112-gun first-rate ship of the line class of two ships of the Royal Navy. The class was ordered during the arms race on the Great Lakes during the War of 1812 between Britain and America. Built at Kingston Royal Naval Dockyard, the ships were similar in design to their predecessor on Lake Ontario, the 102-gun HMS St Lawrence, but also included a quarterdeck or poopdeck. The two ships of the class, Wolfe and Canada, were laid down towards the end of 1814 but had not been completed when the war ended in the following year. Construction was suspended and the ship frames were left at the dockyard until 1831 and 1832 respectively when they were cancelled.

== Background and design ==
Throughout the War of 1812 America and Britain fought for control of the strategically important Great Lakes. (Note: The lakes had originally been patrolled by the Provincial Marine, but after its poor performance against the initial United States Navy invasion it had been replaced on the lakes by a Royal Navy detachment from the North America Station.) As both sides looked to defeat the other an arms race took place in the construction of warships. This escalated quickly, increasing from 20-gun corvettes like HMS Montreal to 56-gun frigates like HMS Psyche. Early vessels on the Great Lakes had been built very shallowly to avoid the numerous shoals and bars, but this negatively affected their sailing characteristics. The new warships built by the Royal Navy prioritised speed and firepower instead and so were deeper than their forebears, although still shallower than conventional sea-going ships of their types.

The Royal Navy warships built on the Great Lakes during the war were necessarily adapted in their designs for service in the unique location, but embraced modern design features that the Royal Navy had developed for its sea-going fleet as well. They used the newly fashionable flat sheers and wall sides in their designs, and were flush decked with minimal stern gallerys.

The arms race continued, and culminated in the construction of three-decked first-rate ships of the line for service on Lake Ontario. The first of these was the 102-gun ship of the line HMS St Lawrence, designed by shipwright William Bell at Amherstburg Royal Naval Dockyard. St Lawrence, while designated as a normal ship of her type, was highly dissimilar to the extant British first rates. Being planned for service in a freshwater lake, the design of St Lawrence did not include the large amount of storage space other ships required for drinking supplies. This resulted in St Lawrence being smaller and more shallow in draught than other first rates, although she still incorporated the sharp and somewhat deep hull that Great Lakes warships had switched to for the increase in speed. The ship also had an unusually rounded bow, and was more similar in outline to a spar-decked frigate than a ship of the line.

Despite much controversy over the design, St Lawrence was completed in October 1814. As soon as she was ready for sea the ship tilted the balance of power on Lake Ontario towards the British to such a degree that the American squadron ended its operations on the lake and anchored at Sackets where it stayed for the rest of the war, only performing minor patrols with its smaller warships.

The arms race on the Great Lakes continued after the construction of St Lawrence, and the American shipyards began a first rate construction program of their own. Two 120-gun ships of the line, USS New Orleans and USS Chippewa, were begun, and the British in turn ordered two more ships of the size of St Lawrence to be built later in 1814. The new British ships were designed by Thomas Strickland, a shipwright who had been sent from England to assist in the first rate program. His design was in most characteristics similar to St Lawrence. Unlike the former ship which was flush decked, the two new first rates had a quarterdeck, or poopdeck, included in their design so that a flag officer could be accommodated on board. The two ships were named Wolfe and Canada, with the former being the name ship of the class.

== Construction and armament ==
Wolfe and Canada were both ordered in 1814 to be built at Kingston Royal Naval Dockyard, and laid down in the same year after the end of the sailing season. They were also known respectively as Ship No. 1 and Ship No. 2. Great Lakes ships were mostly built without the use of proper ships knees because of a lack of suitable timber, but alternative methods had been developed in other Royal Dockyards and taken up at Kingston. While the majority of warships were built with oak, the timber shortage meant that the kits of wood brought together for the construction of the Wolfe-class ships were both fir. The ships were constructed to the following dimensions: 191 feet 3 inches (58.3 m) along the gun deck, 157 feet 7 5/8 inches (48 m) at the keel, with a beam of 50 feet 8 inches (15.4 m) and a depth in the hold of 18 feet 4 inches (5.6 m). They were to measure 2,152 40/94 tons burthen. The crew complement is not recorded; St Lawrence had one of 700.

The Wolfe-class ships were laid down to hold 112 long guns. While the exact distribution of these guns throughout the ships and their decks is not recorded, thirty-six of them were to be 32-pounder long guns and seventy-six of them 24-pounder long guns. Both ships were built with 104 gun ports. Naval historian Don Bamford records that the ships were in fact planned to hold 120 guns, similar to New Orleans and Chippewa.

== Cancellation ==
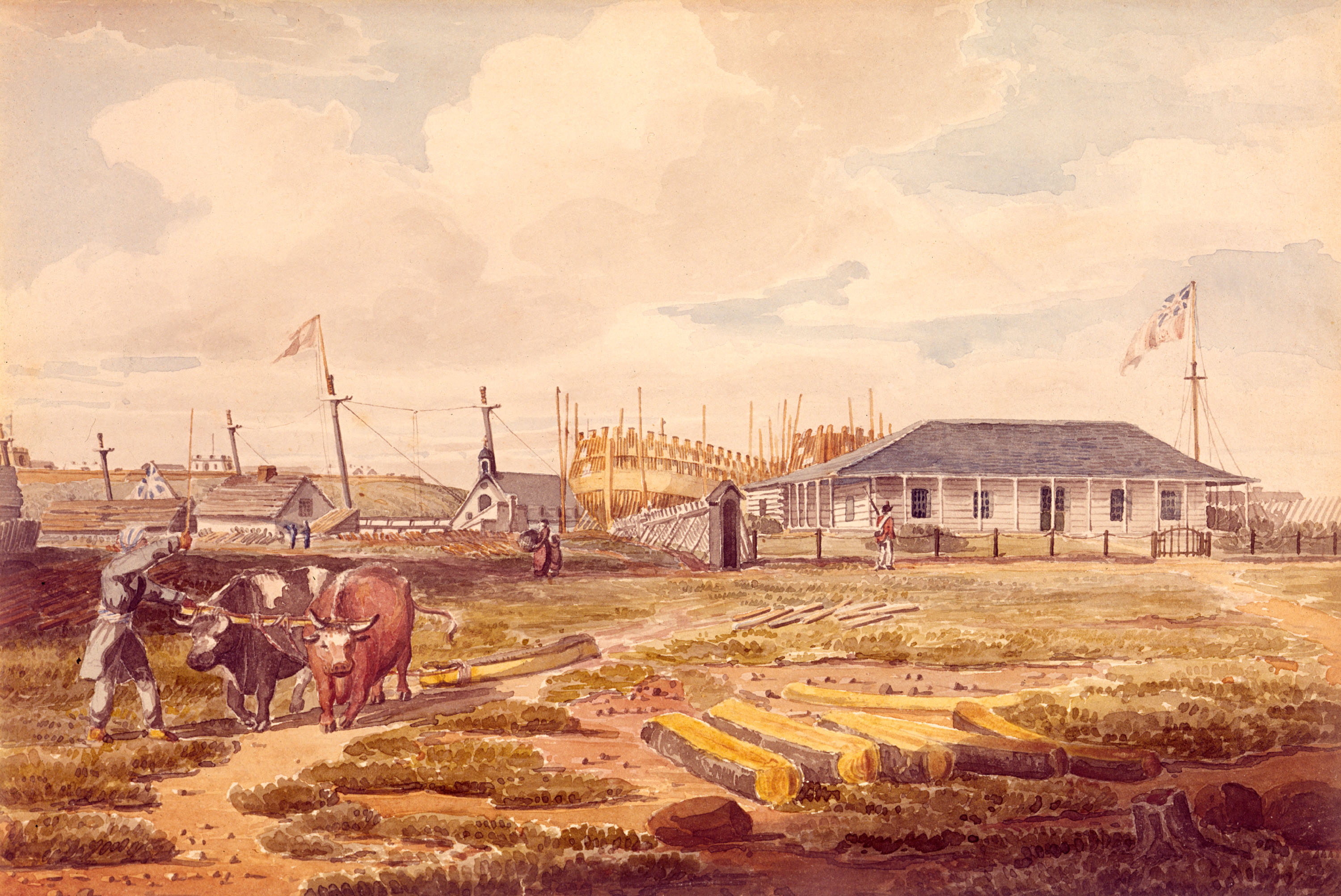
Kingston Royal Naval Dockyard, 1815, by Emeric Essex Vidal. The incomplete hulls of Wolfe and Canada are visible in the middle background

Ship name	Builder	Ordered	Laid down	Suspended	Cancelled	Fate	Ref.
Wolfe	Kingston Royal Naval Dockyard	1814	1814	1815	1831	Destroyed by storm 31 July 1832	
Canada	Kingston Royal Naval Dockyard	1814	1814	1815	1832	Broken up	

When the War of 1812 ended in February 1815 the arms race on the Great Lakes abruptly stopped and the need for more ships was removed. The two Wolfe-class ships were not finished, but their wooden frames had been completed. The Royal Navy commander on Lake Ontario, Commodore Sir James Yeo, cancelled several ongoing shipbuilding projects in around late February, but ordered that work on Wolfe and Canada be continued. Construction was suspended rather than cancelled in March, and the shipbuilding facilities at the dockyard were reduced. Had the war continued into 1816 all five first rates constructed on the Great Lakes would have been completed, leading to what historian Donald R. Hickey describes as "five of the most powerful warships in the world...concentrated within thirty-five miles of each other...on an inland lake with no access to the sea".

In 1817 the Rush-Bagot Agreement was signed, severely limiting the number of warships the two sides could keep on the lakes, with only one each allowed on Lake Ontario. The various naval facilities on the lakes became at most supply depots. This left the Royal Navy's part-built warships in ship graveyards. The frames of Wolfe and Canada were left on the stocks at Kingston for another fifteen years and never completed. In the 1830s the dockyard began to be dispersed with. Wolfe was officially cancelled in 1831 and Canada followed her in 1832. The frame of Wolfe was then destroyed in a storm on 31 July, and Canada was broken up on the stocks.
