= HMS Royal George (1809) =

1809 sloop-of-war

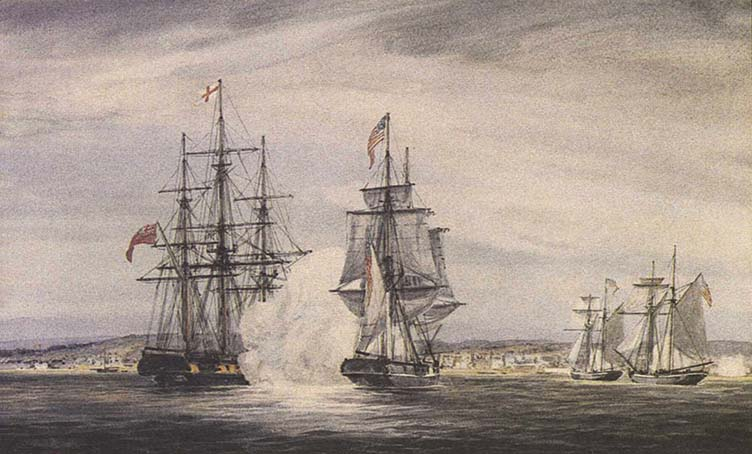
- Depiction of the engagement of Royal George and the American brig Oneida in Kingston harbour

History

United Kingdom
- Name: HMS Royal George
- Builder: Kingston Royal Naval Dockyard, Kingston
- Laid down: February 1809
- Launched: July 1809
- Renamed: Niagara 22 January 1814
- Honours and awards: War of 1812
- Fate: Sold in 1837
- Notes: Provincial Marine vessel

General characteristics
- Class & type: Sloop-of-war
- Tons burthen: 330 20/94 (bm)
- Length: 96 ft 9 in (29.5 m) (gundeck); 81 ft 11 1/4 in (25.0 m) (keel)
- Beam: 27 ft 7 in (8.4 m)
- Draught: 11 ft 0 in (3.4 m)
- Sail plan: Square-rigged corvette
- Complement: 95
- Armament: 8 × 24-pounder guns; 2 × 12-pounder guns; 10 × 24-pounder carronades

HMS Royal George was a British 20-gun wooden sloop of the Provincial Marine, and subsequently, the Royal Navy, operating on Lake Ontario during the War of 1812. The vessel took part in several Engagements on Lake Ontario and was the flagship of the Provincial Marine at the First Battle of Sackett's Harbor. In 1814, the vessel was renamed Niagara. Following the war, the sloop was converted to a transport and sold in 1837.

== Description ==
Royal George was designed by Master Shipwright John Dennis of the Provincial Marine. The vessel measured 330 20/94 tons burthen and was 96 ft 9 in (29.5 m) long at the gundeck and 81 ft 11 1/4 in (25.0 m) at the keel. The sloop had a beam of 27 ft 7 in (8.4 m) and a draught of 11 ft 0 in (3.4 m). The vessel was quantified a "ship corvette, square-rigged with a flush upper deck."

Royal George was initially armed with twenty 32-pounder (15 kg) carronades. In early 1813, two of the carronades were replaced with two 9-pounder (4.1 kg) guns. Later that year two more 32-pounder carronades were replaced with two 68-pounder (31 kg) carronades and the 9-pounder guns replaced with 18-pounder (8.2 kg) guns. By 1814, the vessel's armament was eighteen 32-pounder carronades, two 18-pounder guns and one 24-pounder (11 kg) gun. By 1815 Royal George was armed with eight 24-pounder guns, two 12-pounder (5.4 kg) guns and ten 24-pounder carronades. The initial complement was 95, by 1830, it had grown to 175.

== Service history ==
In 1808, the British learned that the United States was constructing the brig Oneida at Oswego, New York. Their response was to order the construction of a warship that could match the capabilities of the American ship. The vessel's keel was laid down at the Kingston Royal Naval Dockyard in Kingston, Upper Canada in February 1809 and launched in July 1809. Royal George remained in a non-commissioned state until 1811 after the American embargo on Great Britain was lifted. The vessel entered service only after the Americans began to ready themselves for war. In 1811, the Provincial Marine underwent a review by Major General Isaac Brock and command of the force was given to Lieutenant Hugh Earl, who was promoted to Master and Commander of Royal George, now the flagship of the Provincial Marine.

The War of 1812 began in July of that year and at the outset of the war, the British fleet on Lake Ontario was more powerful than their American foe. On 19 July, Royal George, Earl of Moira, Prince Regent and Duke of Gloucester and a fifth unnamed ship, appeared off Sackett's Harbor, New York intent on battling with Oneida. At 06:00 Oneida sailed out intending to separate the British fleet into groups, but the British kept together and Oneida returned to port. There it anchored near the naval yard. Royal George, Moira and Prince Regent then sailed into the bay. The wind faltered during the British fleet's approach, allowing time for the carronades aboard Oneida to be carried ashore and mounted in the fortifications. As the British approached, the Americans began firing, claiming to have hulled Royal George several times. The British broke off their attack and retreated from the First Battle of Sacket's Harbor. For the rest of the summer and autumn of 1812, Royal George would primarily be used as a transport service for men and ammunition for the British Army.

On 1 October, Earl in Royal George anchored off the Genesee River and sent an armed party ashore to Charlotte, New York. The 80 armed men seized the dismantled sloop Lady Murray and a revenue cutter. Departing that day, they returned on 2 October to demand the rigging and masts for the sloop. At the time of the raid, Royal George was crewed by fifty members of the Provincial Marine with 64 members of the Royal Newfoundland Regiment augmenting them. This was the only success during the Engagements on Lake Ontario that took place while the British fleet was under the sole command of the Provincial Marine.

=== Flight of Royal George ===
In November 1812, Royal George was the largest warship on the lake, operating under the command of Hugh Earl (or "Earle"). On 9 November 1812, an American fleet of seven vessels under the command of Commodore Isaac Chauncey surprised Royal George as the sloop passed near the Bay of Quinte on Lake Ontario. Royal George eluded the American vessels by slipping into the North Channel between Amherst Island and the mainland as night fell, making her way into the safety of her home harbour at Kingston by 02:00.

The following morning, 10 November, the American fleet resumed the pursuit, burning a small commercial vessel near Bath and proceeding along the shore. As they approached Kingston, they came under fire from shore batteries. Chauncey directed his vessel, Oneida and the rest of the American squadron to bombard and attempt to seize Royal George within Kingston's harbour. Artillery fire from the shore batteries along the shoreline, including two batteries on Point Henry, attempted to prevent them from closing on the British vessel. Round shot from the American vessels penetrated into the town but they were unable to capture Royal George, which had retreated further into the harbour around 16:00. At the end of the day, they anchored out of sight of Kingston, intending to resume their attack the next day. However, an approaching storm caused Chauncey to withdraw to the American base at Sacketts Harbor without seizing their prize. One sailor was killed aboard Royal George, but little damage had been done to the ship beyond torn up rigging.

This would be the only American attack on Kingston during the War of 1812 as more personnel were sent to this important military and naval centre and strong fortifications were built on Point Henry to defend the dockyards. It was the only time that shots were fired from Point Henry in its history.

=== Arrival of Commodore Yeo ===
During the winter of 1812–1813, the condition of Royal George deteriorated and during an inspection, the vessel was found to be "filthy and disorganized." In November Chauncey ordered the blockade of Kingston by gunboats which prevented Royal George and the rest of the British squadron from resupplying garrisons on the Niagara Peninsula. In May 1813, Commander Robert Barclay arrived to take command of the Lake Ontario squadron, replacing Earl who was made supervisor of the naval arsenal. Barclay's posting was temporary as Captain Sir James Lucas Yeo had been named to take command of the naval forces on the Great Lakes, and given the flag rank of commodore. Yeo arrived at Kingston on 16 May 1813, with Barclay departing to command the squadron on Lake Erie. The commands of the ships were shuffled, and Commander William Mulcaster was given command of Royal George, which was now manned by mostly Royal Navy personnel. The remaining Provincial Marine personnel were scattered throughout the squadron.

On 27 May, Royal George was part of the squadron that set out to attack Sacketts Harbor with elements of British infantry. The squadron arrived on 28 May and promptly captured 115 American troops transiting the lake. Though Royal George did not directly participate in the following battle, the British managed to succeed in half of their objectives, destroying the American shipyard. Following this, the British withdrew into the lake. On 3 June, the squadron departed Kingston to resupply General John Vincent's forces in the Burlington Heights area. After anchoring overnight at York, Upper Canada, Yeo's force spotted a large American encampment near Forty Mile Creek. Yeo then ordered Beresford and Royal George to bombard the camp while the rest of the squadron resupplied Vincent. Confronted by Vincent's advancing force and Yeo's bombarding ships, the Americans withdrew quickly to Fort George. The squadron remained off Forty Mile Creek until 11 June and then set sail along the southern shore of Lake Ontario, trading fire with the fortifications at Fort Oswego and raiding Sodus. The squadron returned to Kingston on 26 June, transporting some of the Americans captured at the Battle of Beaver Dams.

The squadron returned to Lake Ontario on 31 July. On 6 August, Royal George's main powder magazine was flooded after the vessel sprang a leak. The sloop's store of powder was ruined and was only replenished from the other vessels of the squadron. However, the location of the leak was not found, with the pumps manned at all hours. The American squadron was spotted off Niagara River on 7 August at 04:30. Sailing southwest, the firing began at 07:30, but Chauncey turned east to keep his squadron under the protection of American shore batteries. In response, Yeo turned north, ending the engagement. On 10 August, the two squadrons came together again and Royal George, along with HMS Wolfe and HMS Lord Melville, forced the surrender of two American schooners, Julia and Growler. Following the engagement, the British squadron anchored at York on 11 August. There, Royal George's leak was found and repaired. The squadron departed on 13 August for Fort Niagara before heading for Kingston, arriving on 19 August.

On 24 August, Yeo's squadron sailed again. They met the American squadron off the Genesee River on 11 September. Firing began at 14:30. Royal George and Lord Melville were the two British ships closest to the American battle line and suffered torn sails and rigging. Between the two vessels, they endured four killed and five wounded. At 16:00 the British retreated. Royal George was tasked with taking the schooner Hamilton under tow as Hamilton could not keep up with the rest of the squadron. The British returned to Kingston on 12 September. During the dockside period, Royal George received its circle-mounted 24-pounder long gun.

Yeo and his squadron departed Kingston on 19 September, anchoring in Burlington Bay on 26 September. In what would become known as the "Burlington Races", Yeo engaged the Americans on 28 September. Trading shots with the American vessel General Pike, the British squadron's flagship Wolfe was crippled when the vessel's main topmast was brought down. Mulcaster placed Royal George between the two vessels, allowing Wolfe time to fix the problem. Royal George exchanged broadsides with General Pike, later joined by Lord Melville and Earl of Moira, forcing General Pike to turn away. Unable to fight aboard Wolfe, Yeo retreated to his anchorage in Burlington Bay, followed by the rest of the squadron. Once there, Royal George lost its foretopmast as it came into the anchorage. Once repairs were complete, the squadron sailed to confer with the British land forces commander, Major General Francis de Rottenburg at Four Mile Creek before returning to Kingston on 7 October.

On 28 September, William Mulcaster was promoted to post captain and was awarded command of HMS Princess Charlotte, under construction at Kingston. Royal George made one last patrol on 3 December before being laid up for the winter, during which the vessel was careened.

=== As Niagara and fate ===
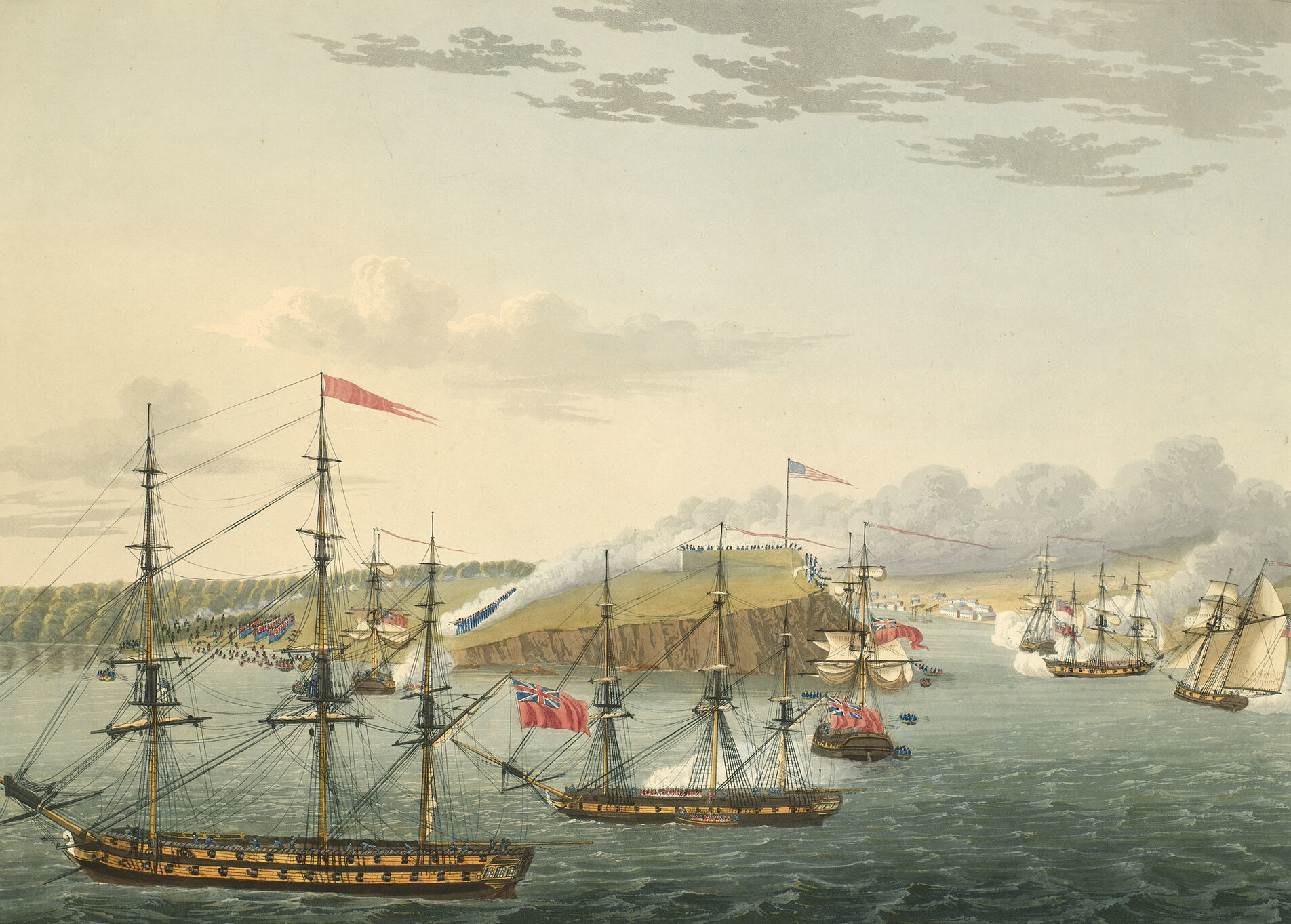
The attack on Fort Oswego, Lake Ontario, Niagara is second from right in the picture.

Royal George was renamed Niagara on 22 January 1814. The vessel was reclassified from a sloop to a sixth rate and Captain Stephen Popham was awarded command. (Note: According to the Dictionary of Canadian Biography, Francis Spilsbury was given command of Niagara during the attack on Fort Oswego on 6 May and was part of the force captured with Captain Popham at Sandy Creek.) Once the Great Lakes became clear for navigation, Yeo intended to attack Fort Oswego. The squadron departed on 4 May with 400 Royal Marines and 550 soldiers embarked. They arrived on 5 May and during the night, Niagara and Montreal (the ex-Wolfe) slipped closer to shore, closing within 1,000 yards (910 m). At 06:00 on 6 May, the two vessels opened fire attempting to enfilade the shore batteries. Niagara moved even closer to nearly within musket range and began trading fire directly with the fort. Niagara caught fire three times in the exchange. In the end, the British captured the fort and settlement, carrying away its supplies. The force returned to Kingston on 8 May.

The squadron sailed again on 11 May along the south shore of the lake. On 19 May, the squadron imposed a blockade on Sackett's Harbor. Captain Popham was given command of two gunboats and ordered to intercept a flotilla of boats on 29 May. At Sandy Creek, Popham and nearly his entire command was either killed or captured by the Americans the next day. Niagara was manned only by a skeleton crew and to fill out the ship's company, personnel were shifted from HMS Magnet and HMS Netley. The blockade was lifted on 5 June and the squadron anchored in the Bay of Quinte. Captain Henry Davies was then given command of Niagara. The squadron returned to Kingston on 13 June and Niagara remained alongside for the better part of the summer.

Following the launch of HMS St Lawrence on 10 September, in the resulting command shuffle, Captain Edward Collier was given command of Niagara with Captain Davies being given command of HMS Prince Regent. St Lawrence, Prince Regent, HMS Princess Charlotte, Montreal and Niagara sailed from Kingston on 16 October and returned on 24 October. Upon the arrival of St Lawrence on Lake Ontario, the American squadron retired to Sackett's Harbor and did not venture forth again for the remainder of the war. Collier was then ordered to set up a naval base near Penetanguishene, Upper Canada. Niagara departed Kingston on 28 November carrying twenty of Princess Charlotte's 24-pounder (11 kg) long guns to be used on ships constructed in the new base. Niagara arrived at York, where the supplies and guns were unloaded to be carried overland to the new base. On 24 December 1814, the Treaty of Ghent was signed, ending the War of 1812. Following the war, the vessel was used as a transport ship and was sold in 1837.

=== Historical reenactment ===
From 30 June to 1 July 2012, a 3-day reenactment of the flight of Royal George was performed from Bath, Ontario to Kingston in recognition of the Bicentennial of the War of 1812. The role of Royal George was played by the brig Niagara, one of the last two remaining tall ships with an 1812 heritage.

== See also ==
- Fort Henry, Ontario
