= Toronto (disambiguation) =

Toronto is the capital of Ontario and the largest city in Canada.

Toronto may also refer to:

== Places ==
=== Canada ===
- Metropolitan Toronto, a former regional municipality coterminous with the current city of Toronto
- Old Toronto, a portion of the city of Toronto before the 1998 amalgamation with five other adjacent lower-tier municipalities
- Toronto Islands, a chain of small islands in Lake Ontario that is part of the city of Toronto
- Toronto Township, Ontario, a former township in the city of Mississauga
- Toronto Gore Township, Ontario, a former township that was split and amalgamated into the city of Mississauga and city of Brampton
- Toronto, Prince Edward Island, an unincorporated area

=== United States ===
- Toronto, Illinois, a former unincorporated community
- Toronto, Indiana, an extinct town
- Toronto, Iowa, a town
- Toronto, Kansas, a city
- Toronto, Missouri, an unincorporated community
- Toronto, Ohio, a city
- Toronto, South Dakota, a town

=== Elsewhere ===
- Toronto, New South Wales, Australia, a suburb within the city of Lake Macquarie
- Toronto, County Durham, England, a village
- Toronto Lake (disambiguation), various lakes
- 2104 Toronto, an asteroid

== Sports ==
- Toronto Argonauts, Canadian (gridiron) Football League
- Toronto Blue Jays, Major League Baseball
- Toronto Maple Leafs, National Hockey League
- Toronto Raptors, National Basketball Association
- Toronto FC, Major League Soccer
- Toronto Rock, post-1987 National Lacrosse League
- Toronto Sceptres, Professional Women's Hockey League
- Toronto Tomahawks, 1974–1975 National Lacrosse League
- Toronto Varsity Blues, the sports teams of the University of Toronto, U Sports
- Toronto Wolfpack, professional rugby league

== Vessels ==
- HMCS Toronto, various Canadian Armed Forces ships
- HMS Toronto, various British Royal Navy ships
- a fictional interstellar vessel in the video game Albion

== Other uses ==
- Toronto, a character in the animated series Adventure Time episode "Gold Stars"
- Toronto (band), a 1980s rock band
- Toronto (cocktail), a whisky cocktail
- Toronto, Ipswich, a heritage-listed house in Ipswich, Queensland, Australia
- Joseph Toronto (1818–1893), Italian-born Mormon
- University of Toronto, based in Toronto, Ontario, Canada

== See also ==
- Torontos (disambiguation)
- Toronto space, in topology
- Taranto
- Tronto
