= HMS Wolfe (1813) =

20-gun sloop-of-war

Coordinates: 44.13°N 76.27°W

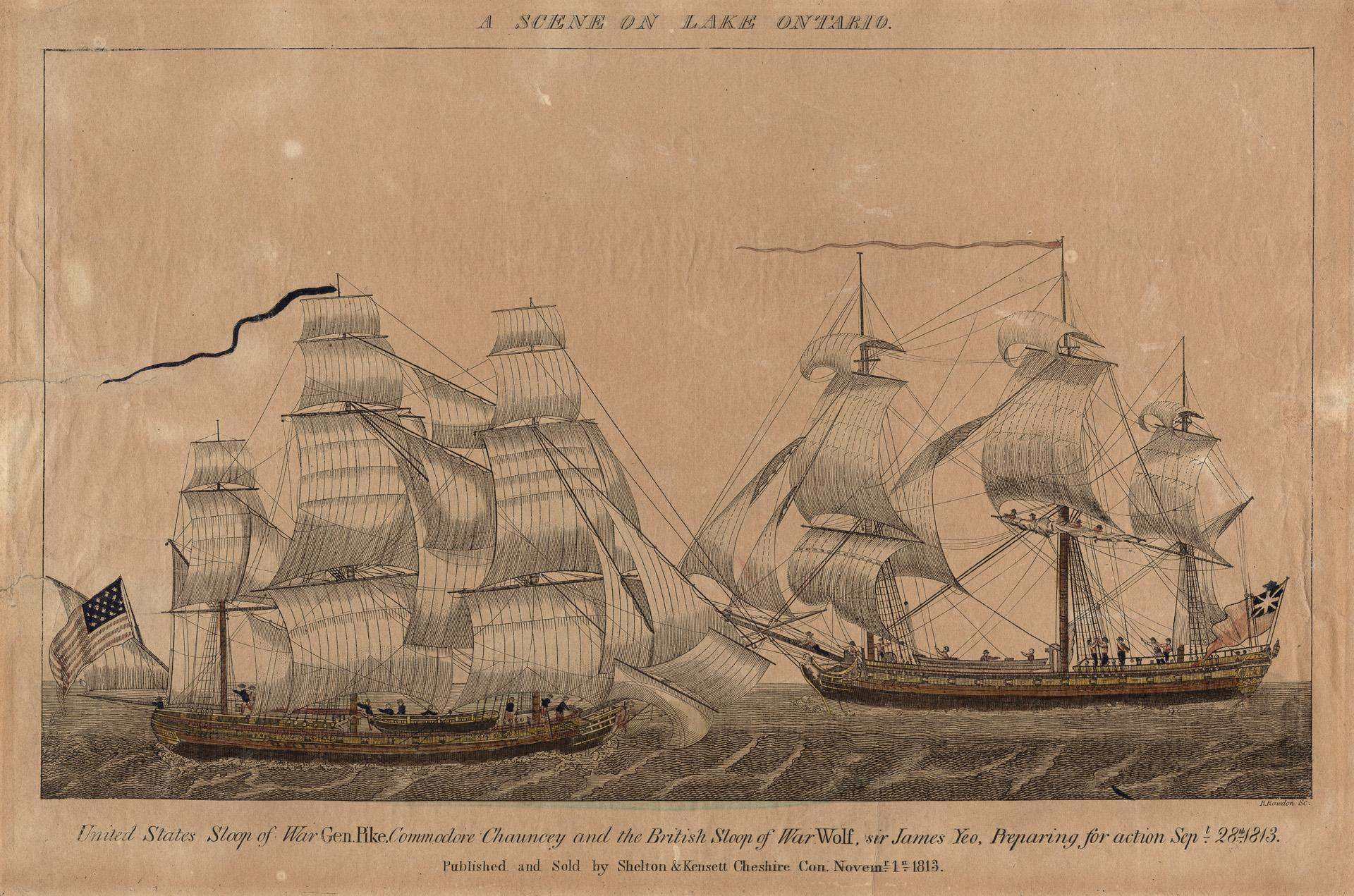
- A scene on Lake Ontario – United States sloop of war Gen. Pike, Commodore Chauncey, and the British sloop of war Wolfe, Sir James Lucas Yeo, preparing for action, 28 September 1813

History

United Kingdom
- Name: Wolfe
- Ordered: 14 December 1812
- Builder: Kingston Royal Naval Dockyard, Kingston
- Launched: 22 April 1813
- Renamed: Montreal in 1814
- Reclassified: Rebuilt as transport in 1815
- Honours and awards: War of 1812
- Fate: Ordered broken up, then ordered sold, in 1831; Presumed rotted and sunk at Kingston

General characteristics
- Type: Sloop-of-war, altered to brig in 1814
- Tons burthen: 426 23/94 (bm)
- Length: 107 ft 0 in (32.6 m) (gun deck); 103 ft 0 in (31.4 m) (keel)
- Beam: 30 ft 10 in (9.4 m)
- Draught: 11 ft 0 in (3.4 m)
- Depth of hold: 4 ft 6 in (1.4 m)
- Propulsion: Sails
- Complement: 224

HMS Wolfe (later HMS Montreal, originally HMS Sir George Prevost) was a 20-gun sloop-of-war, launched at the Kingston Royal Naval Dockyard at Kingston, Upper Canada, on 22 April 1813. She served in the British naval squadron in several engagements on Lake Ontario during the War of 1812. Upon her launch, Wolfe was made the flagship of the squadron until larger vessels became available. Along with the naval engagements on Lake Ontario, Wolfe supported land operations in the Niagara region and at the Battle of Fort Oswego (as Montreal). Following the war, the vessel was laid up in reserve and eventually sold in 1832.

== Description and construction ==
After the outbreak of the war, the British Governor General of Canada, Lieutenant General Sir George Prevost ordered the construction of warships for the Provincial Marine on 14 December 1812 to match American ships being built at Sackett's Harbor, New York. One was to be constructed at Kingston, Upper Canada, the other at York. Designed by Thomas Plucknett, the construction of the vessel was handed over to James Morrison of Montreal who had been hired as master shipwright at Kingston. Progress was slow and Morrison was fired and Daniel Allen, the foreman of the shipwrights, was made master. Daniel Allen was fired in March 1813 for urging his artificers to strike and George Record replaced him as master shipwright of the Kingston yard.

The construction of the new vessel picked up and by April the vessel was ready. On 22 April, the vessel was ready to be launched using a non-traditional method. During the launching, the vessel jammed in her cross-supports and after three days of pulling, was returned to her original position. Launched again on 25 April, this time using the traditional method, the vessel slid into the water successfully. (Note: Colledge & Warlow have the vessel's launch on 5 May 1813.) The vessel was initially named Sir George Prevost after the British governor general, in response to the American Madison, which had been named after the president of the United States. Prevost objected to the name and the vessel was re-christened with the name Wolfe, after the British general who died at the Battle of the Plains of Abraham. A sister ship, named Sir Isaac Brock, was constructed at York, Upper Canada.

Wolfe measured 426 23/94 tons burthen, with a gun deck that measured 107 ft 0 in (32.6 m) and was 103 ft 0 in (31.4 m) long at the keel. The vessel had a beam of 30 ft 10 in (9.4 m), a draught of 11 ft 0 in (3.4 m) and a depth of hold of 4 ft 6 in (1.4 m). Wolfe had only two decks, a flush gun deck above and a berthing deck below, with a shallow hold. The vessel was pierced for twenty-two gun ports. Wolfe was designed to carry her long guns facing forward and astern through bridle ports. When the vessel was launched, the only guns available were eighteen 18-pounder (8 kg) carronades and two 12-pounder (5 kg) long guns. This later changed to four 68-pounder (31 kg) and ten 32-pounder (15 kg) carronades and one 24-pounder (11 kg) and eight 18-pounder long guns. Wolfe ended her war service with eighteen 32-pounder carronades and three 18-pounder long guns. Wolfe had a complement of 224 officers and enlisted.

== Service history ==
The arrival of Commodore Sir James Lucas Yeo at Kingston on 16 May marked the command takeover of the naval forces on the Great Lakes by the Royal Navy from the Provincial Marine. Yeo made Wolfe his flagship and made Commander Daniel Pring as his flag captain. On 27 May, the squadron sailed from Kingston loaded with troops commanded by Sir George Prevost for Sackett's Harbor, New York. They arrived on 28 May and unloaded troops for the assault on the United States Navy's key naval base on Lake Ontario. Though none of the vessels other than Beresford took part in the actual battle, the objectives of the attack were partially met, with the American naval yard being burnt down. The squadron collected the remaining troops and withdrew.

The squadron sailed again from Kingston on 3 June, transporting troops and supplies to the Burlington Heights area. While off Forty Mile Creek, alterations were made to the cabin layout and the painting was finished, as the job had been left incomplete when Wolfe had sailed for Sackett's Harbor. The squadron returned to Kingston on 17 June via the south shore of Lake Ontario, capturing three merchant schooners, two sloops and raiding along the Genesee River and American Eighteen Mile Creek. On 18 June, the squadron sailed again from Kingston, trading shots with Fort Oswego on 19 June and raiding Sodus, New York. The squadron returned on 28 June.

In July, most of the month was spent by Yeo preparing the squadron. Aboard Wolfe the 18-pounder carronades were replaced with 32-pounder versions. In July Pring was sent to command on Lake Champlain. The squadron left Kingston on 31 July to seek out the American squadron under Commodore Isaac Chauncey. The two squadrons met in a series of indecisive clashes though August and September where Wolfe, Royal George and Beresford captured the American schooners Julia and Growler on 10 August. Wolfe was badly damaged by the American vessel General Pike on 28 September, being partly dismasted. She escaped into Burlington Bay at the western end of Lake Ontario. The Americans did not pursue, and the British squadron was able to return to Kingston on 7 October and make repairs. Beyond making a small transport voyage in early October, Wolfe and Royal George remained laid up through the winter months.

=== As Montreal ===
During the winter of 1813–1814, Wolfe was rearmed, with her original medley of guns being replaced by seven long 24-pounder and eighteen long 18-pounder guns. In January 1814, the Royal Navy formally took over ownership of the Great Lakes squadron from the British Army, and all the vessels were added to the Navy List. To avoid duplication of names already on the list, several of the vessels were renamed. Wolfe was renamed Montreal on 22 January 1814. Upon entering Royal Navy service, the vessel was reclassified a sixth rate. As the British had also completed two frigates during the winter, Montreal ceased to be the British flagship and command of the vessel passed to Commander Francis Spilsbury.

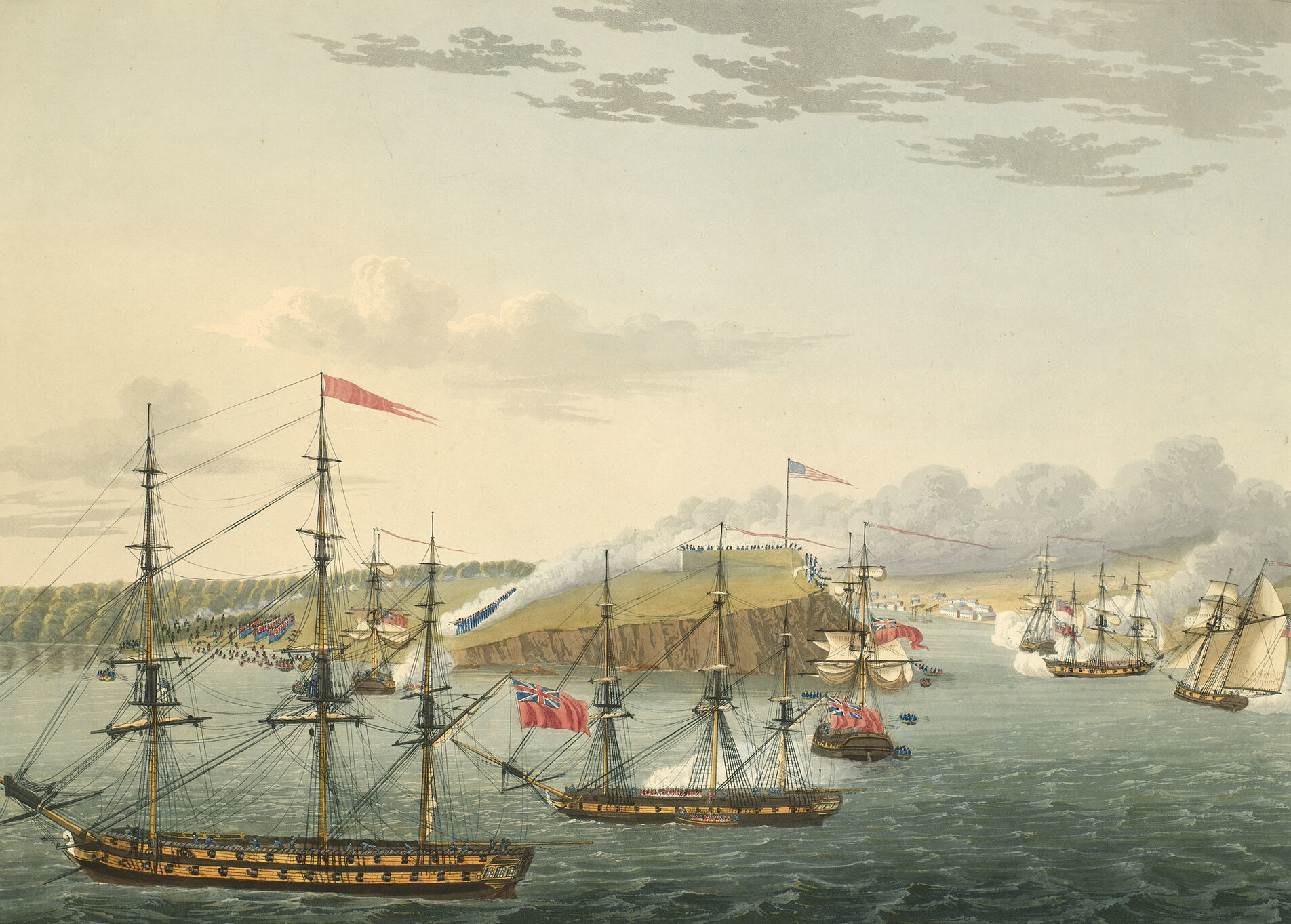
The attack on Fort Oswego, 6 May 1814. Montreal is seen third from right in the picture

On 4 May 1814, the squadron departed Kingston, intent on attacking Fort Oswego again. They arrived the next day and during the night, Montreal and Niagara (the renamed Royal George) got within 1,000 yards (910 m) of the fort. At 06:00 on 6 May, the two vessels opened fire, marking the beginning of the Battle of Fort Oswego. The naval bombardment provided by the squadron drove the American militia back from their chosen place. The attack was successful and the fort and town were captured. After returning to Kingston with the spoils from the attack, Yeo's squadron sailed to blockade Sackett's Harbor. The blockade was put in place on 19 May and Montreal was given the task of patrolling off Stony Island. On 29 May, a large detachment under the command of Captain Stephen Popham of Niagara and Captain Spilsbury departed the squadron in two gunboats and heavy ship's boats intent on capturing an American flotilla of bateaux. At Sandy Creek, the force was defeated by the Americans and Captains Popham and Spilsbury were captured and the majority of the crews of Niagara and Montreal either captured or killed. As a result, men from HMS Netley and HMS Star were transferred to fill out their crews. As a result of the defeat at Sandy Creek, the blockade was lifted on 5 June, with the squadron returning to Kingston on 13 June.

In June, Captain George Downie was given command of Montreal, though through the summer, the vessel did not venture far from Kingston. In September, HMS St Lawrence was launched. Captain Downie was sent to command on Lake Champlain, taking the place of Captain Peter Fisher who had been recalled to Lake Ontario by Commodore Yeo. Fisher was given Downie's vessel, Montreal to command, a situation he was not happy with. Montreal was smaller than the flagship of the Lake Champlain squadron and smaller than HMS Princess Charlotte which had been given to a junior officer. Fisher made a complaint to the Admiralty over the command situation, which would later be one of the reason's for Yeo's recall in November.

St Lawrence's arrival on Lake Ontario ended American attempts to gain control of the lake. On 1 November, the squadron sailed for Fort George, with Montreal among the vessels transporting troops. The squadron returned to Kingston on 10 November. On 28 November, Montreal sailed again, but returned after just three days due to the vessel's poor condition. After the end of the war, Montreal was paid off into the ordinary. The vessel was sold on 1 January 1832.

A wreck located within Kingston Harbour, west of Cedar Island, was discovered in 2002. Known locally as "Guenter's Wreck", the shipwreck was tentatively identified as Montreal, though the final identification has not been declared. An archaeological survey was performed in 2012.

== See also ==
- HMCS Montreal

== Sources ==
- Colledge, J. J.; Warlow, Ben (2006) [1969]. Ships of the Royal Navy: The Complete Record of All Fighting Ships of the Royal Navy from the 15th Century to the Present (3rd Rev ed.). London: Chatham Publishing. ISBN 978-1-86176-281-8. OCLC 67375475.
- Malcomson, Robert (2001) [1998]. Lords of the Lake: The Naval War on Lake Ontario 1812–1814 (Paperback ed.). Toronto: Robin Brass Studio. ISBN 1-896941-24-9.
- Winfield, Rif (2005). British Warships in the Age of Sail 1793–1817: Design, Construction, Careers and Fates. Barnsley, UK: Seaforth Publishing. ISBN 1-86176-246-1.
