= Battle of Sacket's Harbor =

Battle of Sacket's Harbor may refer to:

- Second Battle of Sacket's Harbor, a battle on 29 May 1813, during the War of 1812
- First Battle of Sacket's Harbor, a naval battle fought on July 19, 1812, between American and British naval forces
