= HMS Cockburn =

Several vessels of the Royal Navy have been named HMS Cockburn for Admiral Sir George Cockburn:

- HMS Cockburn (1822) was the former steam vessel Braganza that the Royal Navy purchased in 1822 to serve as a tender to HMS Leven. Cockburn was wrecked in April 1823.
- HMS Cockburn (1827), of 70 tons (bm), was a schooner on Lake Ontario, serving in the Provincial Marine. She was the first vessel authorized under the Rush-Bagot Treaty, and served from 1827 and until paid off in 1834; she was sold in 1837.
- HMS Drury (K316) was a Captain-class frigate, originally commissioned to be built for the United States Navy. Before she was finished in 1942, she was transferred to the Royal Navy under the terms of Lend-Lease, and saw service during the Second World War. She was originally to have been named HMS Cockburn, but the name was changed to HMS Drury prior to her launch by the Philadelphia Navy Yard, Philadelphia, Pennsylvania. Drury was transferred back to the US Navy in 1945 and was scrapped in June 1946.
