= First Battle of Sacket's Harbor =

Battle between the British and Americans

- Part of the War of 1812
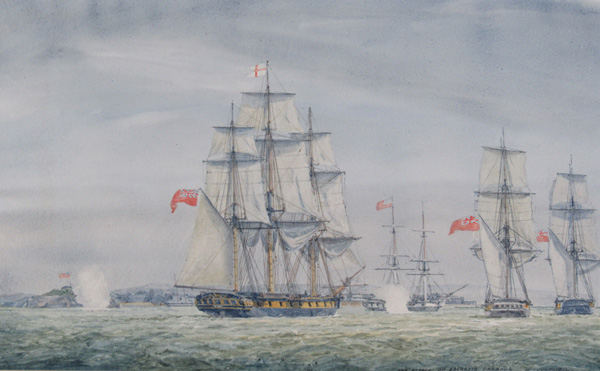
- The Attack on Sacketts Harbour, 19th July 1812, Irwin John David Bevan
Date	July 19, 1812
Location	Sackets Harbor, New York
Result	American victory

Belligerents
United Kingdom	United States

Commanders and leaders
(United Kingdom of Great Britain and Ireland) Hugh Earl	(United States) Melancthon Woolsey

Strength
2 sloops-of-war 1 brig 2 schooners	Land: 1 shore battery 1 regiment of regulars 1 company of artillery 3,000 militia Sea: 1 brig

Casualties and losses
8 killed 1 sloop-of-war severely damaged Unknown damage to other warships	None

The First Battle of Sacket's Harbor (also spelled as Sackett's) was fought on July 19, 1812, between the United States and the British Empire; it was the first engagement of the war between these forces. It resulted in American forces repelling the attack on the village and its important shipbuilding yard, where 12 warships were built for this war.

== Background ==
Sacket's Harbor is located on the southeast shore of Lake Ontario in Northern New York State. It was developed as the chief shipbuilding yard for the United States during the War of 1812, and twelve warships were completed there. With a good strategic position on the lake, abundant resources, and an excellent natural harbor, the small village of several hundred people was engulfed as it developed as the center of military and naval operations for the war's northern theater. Following the first battle, the village and harbor were developed and fortified as a large and centralized military complex, served by several thousand troops and 3,000 workers at the shipyard. The complex became the fourth largest center of population in the state in this period.

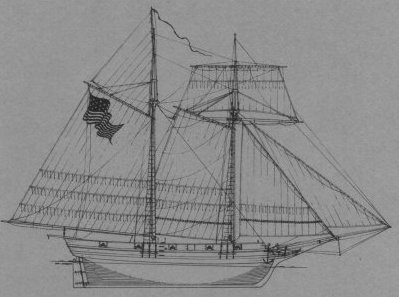
On July 19, the British sent demands for the surrender of American ships in Sackets Harbor, including USS Scourge.

On July 19, 1812, Captain Melancthon Taylor Woolsey, of USS Oneida, discovered from the masthead of his brig five enemy vessels sailing up to Sacket's Harbor. The British vessels, which belonged to the Provincial Marine, were Royal George; (24 guns), Prince Regent (22 guns), Earl of Moira (20 guns), Governor Simcoe (10 guns), and Seneca (2 guns). The British captured a merchant ship carrying flour nearby and sent its crew shore with the demands that the US surrender USS Oneida and Lord Nelson, a merchant ship that US forces had captured before war was declared. They said that if a shot was fired at them, the British would burn the village of Sacket's Harbor.

== Battle ==
The first shots were fired by the British at the brig Oneida, which attempted to escape the incoming British vessels but failed and returned to Navy Point. The British continued on and dropped anchor. Back at the point, Oneida was moored with one broadside of nine guns to the enemy, while the others were taken out and hastily placed on a breastwork along the shoreline, near where a 32-pounder cannon, intended for Oneida, but found too heavy, had been mounted on a pivot. Below the cannon a protective mound had been constructed about 6 feet (1.8 m) high.

Alarm guns were fired and expresses were sent to call in the neighboring militias. Most of the militia did not arrive in time to render assistance; however, by the end of the day, some 3,000 local militia had assembled but they did not engage. The British had been misinformed about the defenses of the harbor and assumed there was nothing to be feared in the way of ordnance. The force at that time in town was, besides the crew of Oneida, a regiment under Colonel Bellinger, a volunteer company of artillery under Captain Camp, and the militia.

Captain Melancthon Woolsey commanded American troops during the battle.

Captain Woolsey, leaving his brig in charge of a lieutenant, took command on shore, the 32-pounder being in charge of William Vaughan, a sailing master, and the other guns under that of Captain Camp. There was no shot in town larger than 24-pound (11 kg) balls, which were used with the aid of patches made of carpet, in the 32-pounder. By the time these arrangements were made, the enemy had arrived within range, nearly in front of the battery.

The action was commenced; the first shot was fired from the 32-pounder, which failed to hit any of the British ships. A shout of laughter was heard from the fleet just after, indicating that the American's first shot fell too short of target. The British returned a salvo briskly at the American battery and continued for two hours. Most of the British shots were reportedly accurate. The Americans returned fire throughout the bombardment; Oneida's broadsides and their 32-pounder inflicted many hits or near hits on the Royal Navy vessels.

Towards the close of the action, as the flagship Royal George was maneuvering to fire another broadside, a 24-pound shot struck her stern and raked her whole length, killing eight men, and doing much damage. Royal George also had severe damage to her top mast and rigging. Other British warships were damaged but the extent is unknown. Upon this, the signal of retreat was given and the British fleet bore away for Kingston, Upper Canada, without ceremony. The American band struck up the national tune of "Yankee Doodle," and the troops yelled three cheers of victory.

== Aftermath ==
On July 24, 1812, General Jacob Brown attributed the success of the day to the officers Woolsey, Bellinger, and Camp, in their respective capacities, and especially to the crew of the 32-pounder. William Vaughan, who had commanded the 32-pounder, claimed the honor of having fired the first hostile gun in the war. Julius Torry, one of the men at this gun, was an African American better known as Black Julius, and a great favorite in the camp. He served at his post with remarkable activity and courage. As there was no opportunity for the use of small arms, the greater part of the troops who were drawn up, were spectators of the engagement.

== Battlefield preservation ==
The American Battlefield Trust and its partners have acquired and preserved 25 acres (0.10 km^{2}) of the Sacket's Harbor battlefield.

== See also ==
- Second Battle of Sackett's Harbor
- Bibliography of early American naval history, War of 1812

== Bibliography ==
- Cooper, James Fenimore (1856). History of the Navy of the United States of America. Stringer & Townsend, New York. pp. 508. OCLC 197401914.
- Lossing, Benson (1868). The Pictorial Field-Book of the War of 1812. Harper & Brothers, Publishers. ISBN 978-0-665-24384-4.
- Maclay, Edgar Stanton (1894). A History of the United States Navy, from 1775 to 1893. D. Appleton & Company, New York. pp. 647.
- Mahon, John H. (1972). The War of 1812. Da Capo Press, in arrangement with University of Florida Press, 1972. p. 496. ISBN 0-306-80429-8.
- Paine, Ralph Delahaye (1920) [1920]. The Fight for a Free Sea: A Chronicle of the War of 1812. Yale University Press, New Haven, 1920. pp. 235.
- Roosevelt, Theodore (1883). The Naval War of 1812. G.P. Putnam's sons, New York. pp. 541.

=== Further reading ===
- Homans, Benjamin (1833). The Military and Naval Magazine of the United States, Volumes 1–2. Thompson and Homans, Washington. pp. 393.
