= Torontos =

The Torontos may refer to the following professional ice hockey clubs based in Toronto, Ontario, Canada:

- Toronto Blueshirts (1912–1917)
- Toronto Arenas (1917–1919)

== See also ==
- Toronto (disambiguation)
