= Provincial Marine =

North American inland coastal protection service 1796–1910

- Ensign
- Active: 1755–1910; succeeded by the Naval Service of Canada
- Country: The Canadas; Province of Canada; Canada
- Type: Militia
- Engagements: Seven Years' War; War of 1812: Siege of Detroit; Engagements on Lake Ontario; Battle of Lake Erie; Engagements on Lake Huron; Battle of Plattsburgh; Rebellions of 1837–1838; Fenian raids

The Provincial Marine or Marine Department was a coastal protection service in charge of the waters in the Great Lakes, the St. Lawrence River and parts of Lake Champlain under British control. While ships of the Provincial Marine were designated HMS, they were operated in more of a coast guard manner than as a full-fledged navy. Most ships of the Provincial Marine were built on the Great Lakes.

== Creation and organization ==
A British coastal force was created during the Seven Years' War, when a Royal Navy detachment operated vessels against the French on Lake Ontario, the St. Lawrence River and Lake Champlain. During the American Revolutionary War, a flotilla composed of 300 sailors maintained supply routes and supported military actions in the Great Lakes and St. Lawrence River. The Provincial Marine followed the practices and rank structure of the Royal Navy, but with some flexibility.

On 11 October 1776, a flotilla of gunboats partially manned by members of the coastal force defeated an American force on Lake Champlain. In 1777, the unit transported supplies for General John Burgoyne's Saratoga campaign. In 1779, the naval base at Carleton Island was established and foraging patrols were sent to operate on Lake Huron between Michilimackinac and Detroit. By 1780, the coastal force had thirteen vessels in service; five vessels Lake Ontario and nine on Lake Erie. Following the war, the unit diminished in size, slowly becoming known as the Provincial Marine. The unit was transferred to the department of the Quartermaster-General to the Forces of the British Army following the war. The Provincial Marine was controlled by the army and manned by personnel borrowed from the navy, by soldiers, and by direct recruitment of Great Lakes sailors. The Provincial Marine used mostly lightly armed topsail schooners for transportation purposes, with the exception of the brig General Gage. When the Provincial Marine was not in use by the military, the ships and personnel were occasionally loaned out to merchants in the fur trade.

The Provincial Marine's main base was Carleton Island, on Lake Ontario from 1785–1789. The headquarters was moved to Point Frederick, Kingston in Upper Canada and was used from this location from 1789 until 1813. Merchants who were originally on Carleton Island and moved to Kingston used Provincial Marine vessels for transshipment of goods. Further bases were established at Amherstburg and Quebec City. Kingston and Amherstburg each housed one squadron of ships each, for Lake Ontario and Lake Erie respectively.

The Provincial Marine paid lower wages than private enterprises operating on the Great Lakes. Sailors could earn extra money working in the organization's shipyards. However, the more competent sailors were retained aboard the ships and the less competent were sent to work in the yards. Therefore the better sailors were prevented from making better money and led to the service being short of qualified sailors.

The Royal Navy was responsible for all other bodies of waters off Canada. In 1812, the Provincial Marine operated only four vessels armed with 20 short-barreled guns, and seven vessels in total. The force comprised 9 officers, 101 seamen and 5 artificers at the opening of the War of 1812 at Kingston. The Lake Erie division was in disrepair by 1812, with one serviceable ship, one falling into disrepair and one incapable of sailing.

=== War of 1812 ===
During the War of 1812, the Royal Navy also assumed direct control of the Provincial Marine's vessels in 1813, after the Provincial Marine performed poorly in 1812 against Commodore Isaac Chauncey's American Lake Ontario squadron.

The Royal Navy units under Commodore Sir James Lucas Yeo began commanding the facility after May 1813; the dockyard on Point Frederick grew rapidly. By the end of 1814, the dockyard produced the largest naval squadron on the Great Lakes with 1,600 personnel serving on the flagship St Lawrence and on other vessels. Commodore Yeo replaced most of the provincial officers with Royal Navy officers. Frederick became the permanent Lake Ontario base of the British naval establishment and the headquarters of the senior naval officer on all the Great Lakes.

=== Creation of Great Lakes Navy ===
Since a change of command was insufficient to revitalize the whole lake service, and to counter the activity of the United States Navy it was decided to incorporate all the naval forces and establishments on the lake into the Royal Navy. Commanded by Commodore Sir James Yeo, the Royal Navy took over operations on the Great Lakes from the Provincial Marine in 1813–1815. Sir Edward W. C. Owen commanded the Lakes Service for a short period in 1815. Sir Robert Hall, who was ordered to establish a “respectable naval force”, took command of the Lakes Service in October 1815. Commodore Sir Robert Hall took command of the Kingston skow listed as 56 guns in April 1817. In 1817, the Rush–Bagot Treaty demilitarized the Great Lakes and limited future naval forces in commission on each lake to a single 100-ton gunboat armed with one gun for a total of four vessels.

After Hall laid up the wartime fleet in reserve in Kingston, he left Canada in July 1818. Robert Barrie commanded the Lakes Service from 1819–20. To house the gear of the warships of 1812 laid up in Navy Bay, Captain Barrie built the Stone Frigate in Kingston Dockyard. Captain Barrie expedited the repair of the vessels at the bases in case of any emergency. In August 1827, the schooner Cockburn, was commissioned as the first of the Rush-Bagot treaty gunboats. In 1831, he was ordered by the Admiralty to sell off the old warships of 1812 and to prepare to close down the dockyard fit. He remained there until June 1834, when the inland naval establishment was abolished. In 1834, he was ordered to strike his broad pennant and pay off Cockburn (and later sold 1837). After St Lawrence was sold, for $9,925, the other old warships remained as hulks in the Navy Bay or "in frame" on the stocks on Point Frederick. The naval stores were sold, or sent down to Quebec City for carriage to England. Barrie, a popular figure in Kingston, left for England.

While the treaty banned naval activity in the Great Lakes, the Provincial Marine was reassigned under the waterborne or marine units of the arm of the Canadian Militia and later under the Militia Department. In 1910, the Provincial Marine was replaced by the Naval Service of Canada (under the Naval Service Act).

== Commodores of the Provincial Marine ==
After Commodore Andrews was drowned in the Ontario, Commodore Rene Hypolite Pepin de Laforce, a naval officer, was appointed to command the Provincial Marine on Point Frederick, Lake Ontario on November 15, 1780 and retained the position until 1786. Commodore David Betton commanded the Provincial Marine from 1786 to 1802. Commodore Jean-Baptiste Bouchette commanded the Provincial Marine from 1802 to 1804. Commodore John Steel commanded the Provincial Marine 1804–12; he retired at 75 years of age. Commodore Hugh Earle, a son-in-law of Molly Brant who had been commissioned in the lake service in 1792, commanded the Provincial Marine from 1812–13.

== Bases ==
List of bases that existed prior to 1796 and ones that continued to operate until 1850s.

Lake Ontario

- Kingston Royal Naval Dockyard (1788–1853)
- Naval Shipyards, York (Upper Canada) (1790s–1813)
- Carleton Island Dockyard (1779–1789)

Lake Erie

- Grand River Naval Depot (proposed/never built)
- Amherstburg Royal Naval Dockyard (1796–1813)
- Navy Island Royal Naval Shipyard (1763–1822)

Georgian Bay/Lake Huron

- Pentanguishene Naval Yard (1813–1856)

== Fleet ==
- HMS Caledonia
- HMS Confiance
- HMS Detroit
- HMS Duke of Gloucester
- HMS Earl of Moira
- Nancy
- HMS Prince Regent
- HMS Princess Charlotte
- HMS General Hunter
- HMS Queen Charlotte
- HMS Royal George
- HMS Sir Isaac Brock
- HMS St Lawrence
- Buffalo
- Catherine
- Sophia
- Swift
- HMS Speedy
- Sir Sydney Smith – formerly Governor Simcoe, became HMS Magnet, blown up by own crew 1814 to avoid capture
- Seneca – American merchant schooner commandeered at Kingston, 26 June 1812. Sunk by guns of Fort Niagara, 21 November 1812
- Sir George Prevost – schooner 1813
- Psyche – frigate 1814
- Crystler – gunboat 1814
- Kingston steam vessel 1838
- Niagara
- Queenston – gunboat 1814
- Beckwith – transport 1816
- Brock – schooner 1817
- Canada – unfinished 1815
- Wolfe – unfinished 1815
- Cockburn – schooner 1827; paid off 1834 and sold 1837
- Mohawk – steam vessel 1843
- Cherokee – steam vessel 1841
- Watertown – passenger vessel 1864
- Montreal
- Toronto
- HMS Netley (1814)

== Nova Scotia Provincial Marine ==
The British colony of Nova Scotia began a Provincial Marine in 1750s but the unit's history is limited. What is known is the acquisition of a private vessel, Montague in May 1759. The brigantine was a privately built and owned vessel launched in 1759 on behalf of the government. It was used to transport settlers and provide coastal protection during Seven Years' War. It was sunk in December 1760.

== See also ==
- Canadian Coast Guard
- Royal Canadian Navy
- Canadian units of the War of 1812

== Sources ==
- Chartrand, René (2008). American Loyalist Troops 1775–84. Oxford, UK: Osprey Publishing. ISBN 1-8460-3314-4.
- Gimblett, Richard H. & Hadley, Michael L., eds. (2010). Citizen Sailors: Chronicles of Canada's Naval Reserve. Toronto: Dundurn Press. ISBN 978-1-55488-867-2.
- Gough, Barry (2006). Through Water, Ice & Fire: Schooner Nancy of the War of 1812. Toronto: Dundurn Press. ISBN 1-55002-569-4.
- Hodge, Carl C. & Nolan, Cathal J. (2007). U.S. Presidents and Foreign Policy: From 1789 to the Present. Santa Barbara, California: ABC-CLIO. ISBN 978-1-85109-790-6.
- Malcomson, Robert (2001) [1998]. Lords of the Lake: The Naval War on Lake Ontario 1812–1814 (Paperback ed.). Toronto: Robin Brass Studio. ISBN 1-896941-24-9.
