= John B. Marks =

British sailor and Upper Canada politician

John Bennet Marks (1777 – March 7, 1872) was a naval clerk, farmer and political figure in Upper Canada. He represented Frontenac in the Legislative Assembly of Upper Canada from 1836 to 1841 as a Conservative.

He was born in Plymouth, England. Marks joined the Royal Navy in 1793 and later came to Upper Canada. He served as purser for the Kingston Royal Naval Dockyard during the War of 1812. He was secretary to Commodore Robert Barrie from 1819 to 1834 and a naval storekeeper in Kingston from 1834 to 1844. He was the patron of St. Mark's church, Barriefield. Marks retired to a farm near Barriefield. He served as a colonel in the militia and was a justice of the peace for the Midland District. Marks died in Kingston.
