= HMS Toronto =

Three ships of the Royal Navy have borne the name HMS Toronto. A fourth was renamed before being launched:

- HMS Toronto (1799) was a schooner launched in 1799 and wrecked and subsequently broken up in 1811.
- HMS Toronto (1813) was a schooner listed in 1813 and wrecked in 1817.
- HMS Toronto (1838) was a wooden paddle steamer built as Sir Charles Adam in 1834 purchased in 1838 by the RN from the US and sold in 1843.
- HMS Toronto was to have been an Algerine-class minesweeper. She was renamed HMS Mary Rose before her launch in 1943, and was broken up in 1957.

== See also ==
- HMCS Toronto
