= Kingston Royal Naval Dockyard =

Historical dockyard in Kingston, Ontario

- Kingston, Ontario
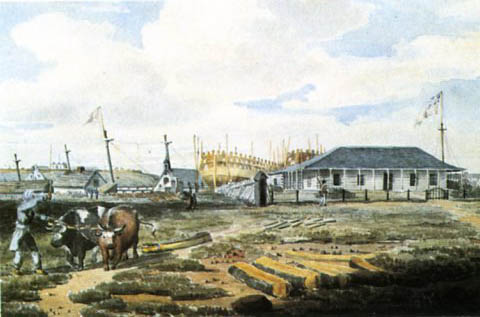
- Naval shipyard, Point Frederick, July 1815. Watercolour by Emeric Essex Vidal. Commodore's house and two ships under construction, the Canada and the Wolfe, can be seen in the background

Site information
- Type: Shipyard, dockyard
- Controlled by: Royal Navy

Location
- Coordinates: 44°13′44″N 76°28′07″W

Site history
- Built: 1788
- In use: 1788–1853
- Battles/wars: Active during the War of 1812

Garrison information
- Garrison: Royal Navy base for Lake Ontario

National Historic Site of Canada
- Official name: Kingston Navy Yard National Historic Site of Canada
- Designated: 1928

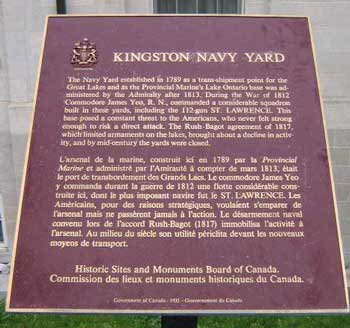
Kingston Royal Naval Dockyard plaque at Royal Military College of Canada

The Kingston Royal Naval Dockyard was a Royal Navy Dockyard from 1788 to 1853 in Kingston, Ontario, Canada, at the site of the current Royal Military College of Canada.

== History ==
The British naval forces on the lakes, known as the Provincial Marine, followed the practices and rank structure of the Royal Navy, but with some flexibility. The Provincial Marine were established and controlled by the army and manned by personnel borrowed from the navy, by soldiers, and by direct recruitment of Great Lakes sailors. The Provincial Marine used lightly armed topsail schooners for transportation.

A government wharf was constructed in 1783 on the eastern side of Lake Ontario by Major John Ross of the 34th Regiment, who was responsible for settling Loyalists at Cataraqui (what is now Kingston) between 1783 and 1785.

In 1785, the place of transshipment for government stores was relocated from Carleton Island to Cataraqui. The merchants who handled transshipment of stores at Carleton Island, using Provincial Marine vessels, built wharves and warehouses near old Fort Frontenac.

=== Naval depot ===
Point Frederick was established as a naval depot in 1789 and ships began to be constructed. Point Frederick served as the Lake Ontario base of the British naval establishment and the headquarters of the senior naval officer on all the Great Lakes from 1789 to 1813. The quarter-master-general's department of the army, who had a monopoly of shipping on the Great Lakes, built transport schooners of the Provincial Marine on Point Frederick by 1792. Because relations with the United States were rapidly deteriorating, a heavily armed, three-masted square-rigged vessel, HMS Royal George, was built in 1809 and launched in Navy Bay specifically for fighting on the lakes, but she was not immediately commissioned. Commodore Hugh Earle was named commander to the Provincial Marine; he commanded the Royal George when she bombarded the American dockyard at Sackets Harbor on 19 July 1812 and when she was attacked by American gunboats off Kingston on 10 November 1812.

Kingston Royal Naval Dockyard was the only Royal Navy base on Lake Ontario, countering the American naval base at nearby Sackets Harbor, New York during the War of 1812.

During the war, British naval operations on the Lake Ontario were centered at Point Frederick, at the confluence of the St. Lawrence and Cataraqui rivers at Lake Ontario. In 1812, the Provincial Marine operated only four vessels armed with 20 short-barreled guns. After May 1813, when the Royal Navy units under Commodore Sir James Yeo took command of the facility, it grew rapidly. At the end of 1814, the Kingston Royal Naval Dockyard produced the largest naval squadron on the Great Lakes, with 1,600 personnel serving on the St. Lawrence, on four other ships, and four smaller vessels, totalling 518 guns." During the war, attacks were launched from the dockyard on the American bases at Sackets Harbour, and Oswego. On 10 November 1812, at the beginning of the war, the Americans pursued HMS Royal George into Kingston harbour and were held off by the shore batteries.

Commanded by Commodore Sir James Lucas Yeo, the Royal Navy took over operations on the Great Lakes from the Provincial Marine in May, 1813. The Lakes Service was raised to the status of a Flag Command and Kingston was the Commodore's headquarters. Yeo's planned attack in 1812 on Sackets Harbor did not come about since General Sir George Prevost failed to complete the attack to destroy the two large American frigates being built there. In 1813, Yeo and Chauncey, the American commander, attempted to out-build the other and refused action except on favourable terms. Yeo captured Oswego and then blockaded Sackets Harbor on 6 May 1814; he was reinforced by two frigates built on Point Frederick. Before the war ended Yeo had commissioned the 112-gun St. Lawrence, a three-decker man-of-war, and two more were being built.

A stone building, built around 1813, was used as a naval hospital and is now known as the ordnance storekeeper's quarters. After the Rush–Bagot Treaty of 1817, the role of the dockyard was restricted to the carriage of troops and supplies to the upper posts.

A blacksmith shop, which was built in the dockyard in 1823, is now used by the Royal Military College of Canada. Half of the Royal Artificer's cottages, which were built in 1822, were destroyed by a fire in the 1880s.

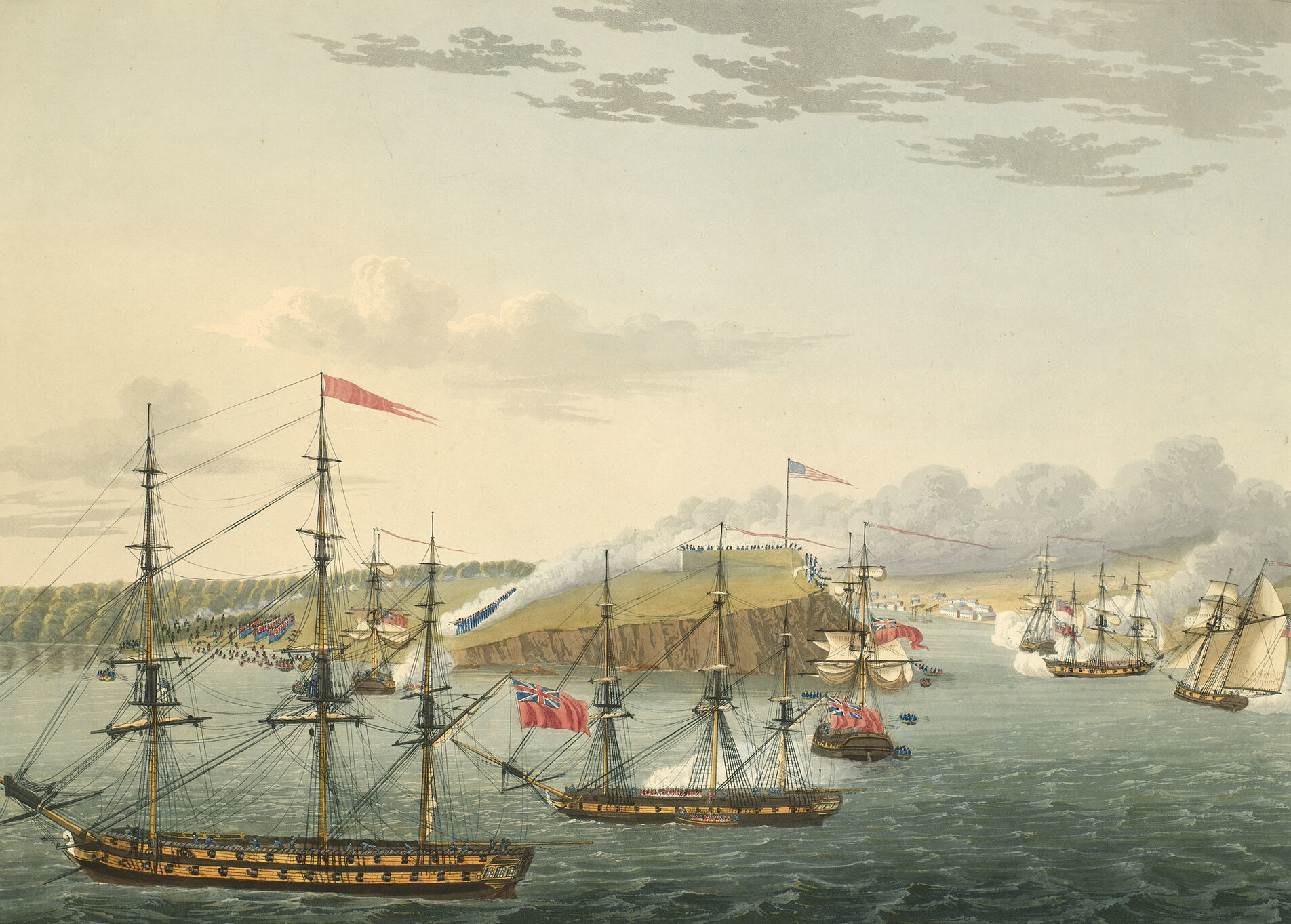
Attack on Fort Oswego (May 1914), War of 1812

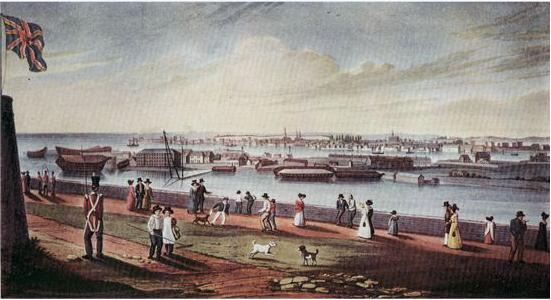
View of Kingston Naval Dockyard from Fort Henry 1820s.

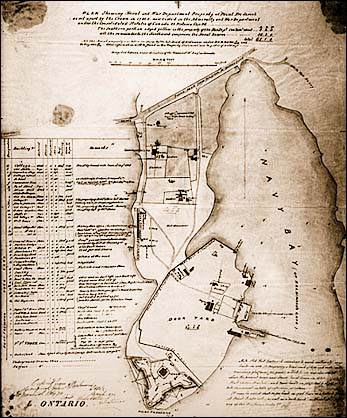
Map of Point Frederick Peninsula, c. 1870 now grounds of the Royal Military College of Canada

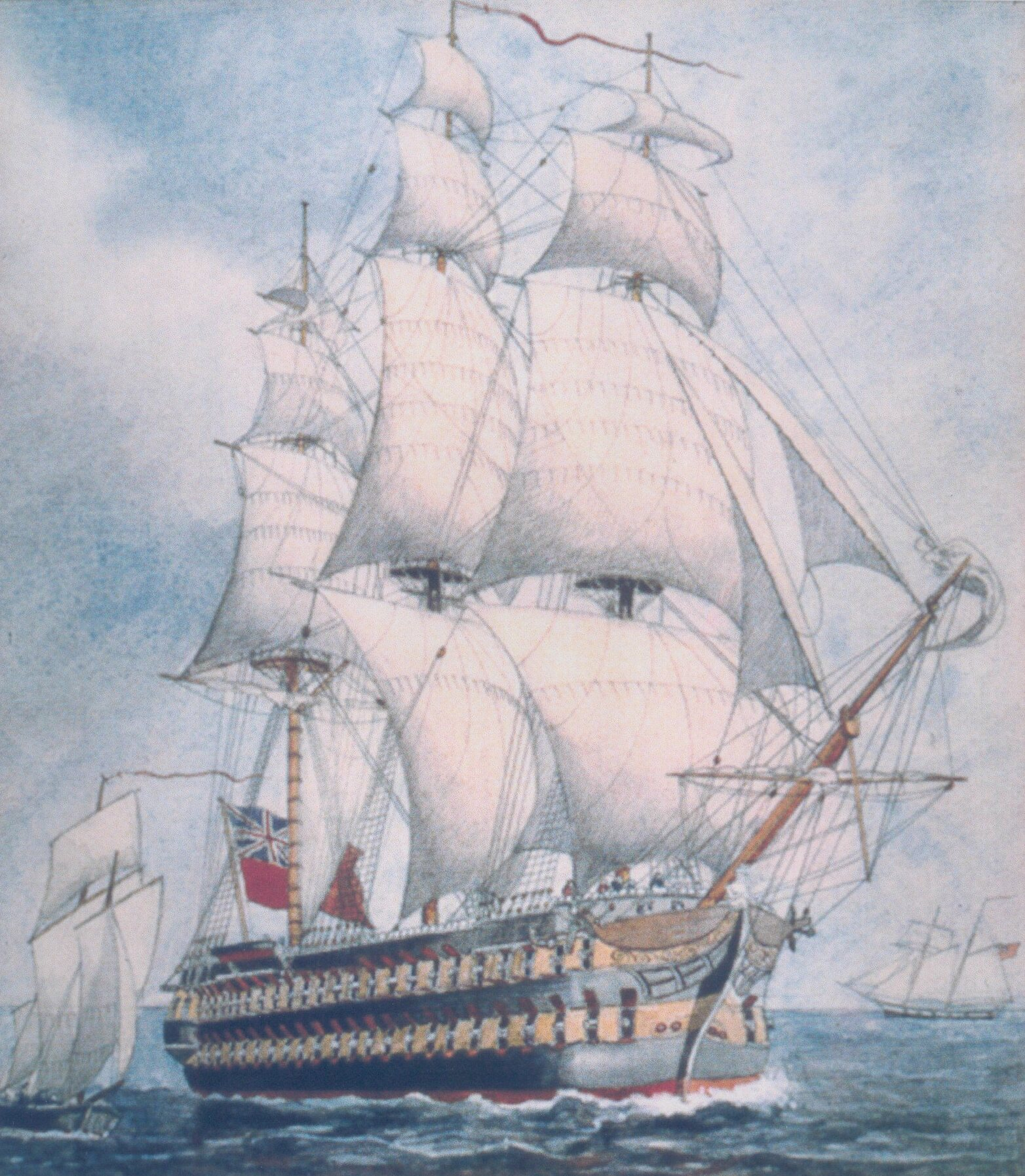
HMS St Lawrence

The War of 1812 has been known as the shipbuilders' war. Ships were built on Point Frederick by the successive commissioners of the dockyard, Captain Richard O'Conor and Sir Robert Hall. Under the terms of the Rush–Bagot agreement of 1817, naval forces on Lake Ontario were restricted to one gunboat. Nevertheless, Sir Robert Hall maintained the ships of the fleet in ordinary until his death in 1818. His replacement, Captain Robert Barrie, built a stone frigate to warehouse the gear and rigging from the ships, which were dismantled and housed in Navy Bay. After the wood barracks burned down in 1816, the Stone Frigate became the main building on Point Frederick. Captain Robert Barrie was recalled and the war ships, which were by the early 1830s merely hulks, were auctioned off.

=== Closures and reopenings ===
In August 1827, Cockburn was commissioned as the first of the treaty gun-boats. In 1831 Barrie received instructions by the Admiralty to sell off the old warships of 1812 and to prepare to close down the dockyard fit. In 1834 he was ordered to strike his broad pennant and pay off the Cockburn. Although St. Lawrence was sold, for $9925, the other warships remained as hulks in Navy Bay or "in frame" on the stocks on Point Frederick. The naval stores were sold, or sent down to Quebec for carriage to England. Barrie left for England in 1834.

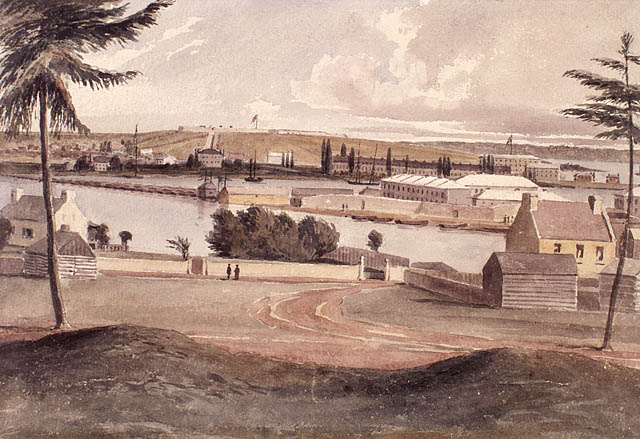
Fort Henry, Point Frederick and Tete du Pont Barracks, Kingston, from the old redoubt (1841) by Lieutenant Philip John Bainbrigge

Closed in 1835, the dockyard reopened in 1837 in response to the Rebellions of 1837. Vessels were hurriedly bought and armed and manned by sailors from the fleet. In the spring of 1838 Captain Williams Sandom, R.N., garrisoned his Royal Marines in the dockyard warehouse the Stone Frigate to St. Lawrence pier in Navy Bay and rebought Netley, one of the old hulks of 1812 which still lay on stocks in the dockyard. She was commissioned as HMS Niagara and served as their headquarters until she was paid off in January 1843. Sandom, who commanded fleets armed, two steamships, Queen Victoria and Cobourg. When Bill Johnson's "Hunter Patriots" invaded Canada below Prescott, Sandom carried the militia on his steam vessels to defeat the insurgents at the Battle of the Windmill. Steamships were hired to transport regulars and militia from Kingston at the Battle of the Windmill, near Prescott. Steam warships operated from the dockyard. Lieutenant Philip John Bainbrigge (1817–1881), a Royal Engineer posted to Canada from 1836 to 1842, painted "Fort Henry, Point Frederick and Tete du Pont Barracks, Kingston, from the old redoubt" (August 1841) showing the Naval Cottages, the hospital, Stone Frigate, Point Henry and Fort Henry in the distance. The flag flying from atop the Stone Frigate indicates Sandom's HQ.

After 1838, the British government revived the naval establishment on the lakes and built Minos (1840), a steam war-vessel, and Cherokee (1841), a wooden paddle-wheel steam warship, which the US saw as a breach of the Rush-Bagot Agreement. Niagara’s place was taken by the commissioning, on 3 April 1843, of a small iron steam warship which had been assembled in 1842. Although Sandom returned to England in 1843, other officers remained with the new steamships to patrol Lake Ontario. The dockyard was officially re-opened, in charge of a clerk David Taylor, on 3 April 1845–1850. Commander William N. Fowell, then serving on Mohawk, assumed command of all naval vessels on the lakes and he took up his residence in the "Commodore's Cottage" on Point Frederick.

The Oregon boundary dispute of 1845 increased the need for naval preparations on the lakes. Vessels were hurriedly bought and armed and manned by sailors from the fleet. In 1846, Mohawk went to Lake Erie and Cherokee was commissioned for the first time. One of the towers, known as Fort Frederick, was built by Royal Engineers on Point Frederick near the old dockyard. By 1850, Cherokee was laid up, and Mohawk returned to harbour duty in Kingston.

Lt. Commander Frederick Charles Herbert was the last naval officer to command on Point Frederick 1850–1853. On 21 June 1852 he was ordered by the Admiralty to pay off Mohawk, which was sold out of the service. Her captain, Lt. Commander Frederick Charles Herbert, returned to England once the dockyard closed in 1853.

The Fenian raids of 1866 brought another revival of naval power on the lakes. Vessels were hurriedly bought and armed and manned by sailors from the fleet. The wooden paddle-wheel steam tug St. Andrews, the sailing steamer Hercules, Canada, and Royal patrolled from Montreal to Kingston, where they used the facilities at Point Frederick and at Navy Bay. When the danger receded, however, no permanent naval establishment on the lakes was set up.

=== Final closure and conversion to college ===
On 1 July 1867, the gunboat Hercules, which had been especially recommissioned for the celebrations of the birth of a nation, took part in the celebrations. In combined exercises with the militia she "engaged the fort with her guns". In the evening a pyrotechnic display included "blue lights from H.M. Stores Dockyard" In 1870, the British garrisons were withdrawn. The remaining naval stores in the Stone Frigate, valued at $357,000 were shipped to England in the barge Frontenac.

The ordnance and admiralty lands in Kingston, which included the dockyard on Point Frederick, were transferred to the Dominion of Canada by the Admiralty on condition that it should be used only for "Naval purposes and for the naval defence of Canada." An order in council ratified the agreement adding the phrase and for the naval defence of Canada.

In 1871 the militia encamped on the Point. In 1875 it was selected as the site for the new Military College, the students being housed in the Stone Frigate from 1876. A wooden commodore's house, which was shown on a plan dated 1868–1870, was still standing when the Royal Military College of Canada opened in the 1876. By the 1860s, only the Stone Frigate storehouse and one wharf were kept in repair. The old hulks of the War of 1812 were hard aground in the mud and broken by the annual freezing and thawing of Navy Bay and Deadman Bay.

The site was designated a National Historic Site of Canada in 1928.

== Commanders ==
Commodore Rene Hypolite Pepin de Laforce, a naval officer, was appointed to command the Provincial Marine on Point Frederick on 15 November 1780 – 1786. Commodore David Betton commanded the Provincial Marine 1786–1802. Commodore Jean-Baptiste Bouchette commanded the Provincial Marine 1802–1804. Commodore John Steel commanded the Provincial Marine 1804–1812 until retiring at 75 years of age. Commodore Hugh Earle, a son-in-law of Molly Brant who had been commissioned in the Lakes Service in 1792, commanded the Provincial Marine from 1812 to 1813. Since a change of command was insufficient to revitalize the whole lake service, it was decided to incorporate all the naval forces and establishments on the lake into the Royal Navy. Commanded by Commodore Sir James Lucas Yeo, the Royal Navy took over operations on the Great Lakes from the Provincial Marine in 1813–1815. Sir Edward W. C. Owen, K.C.B. commanded the Lakes Service for a short period in 1815. Sir Robert Hall, K.C.B., who was ordered to establish a "respectable naval force", took command of the Lakes Service in October 1815 – 1818. Commodore Sir Robert Hall took command of the Kingston Skow listed as 56 guns in April 1817. In 1817, the Rush-Bagot agreement limited future naval forces in commission on each lake to a single 100-ton gunboat armed with one gun. After Hall laid up the wartime fleet in reserve in Kingston, he left Canada in July 1818. Robert Barrie commanded the Lakes Service from 1819 to 1820. To house the gear of the warships of 1812 laid up in Navy Bay, Captain Barrie built the Stone Frigate in Kingston Dockyard. "Commodore's Cottage" was a house which Barrie had built on the site of the present Hewitt House. Captain Barrie expedited the repair of the vessels at the bases in case of any emergency. From December 1820, the command of Flag Officer of the Great Lakes disappeared from the Navy List and in March 1824 Barrie's headquarters was shown to have been transferred to Kingston where he was listed as "Acting Resident Commissioner, Kingston, Upper Canada" 1827–34.

The dockyard was in the care of John B. Marks, naval clerk, the patron of St. Mark's church, Barriefield from 1834 to 1838. In 1835–1837 the yard was completely closed down. Captain Williams Sandom, R.N., commanded the dockyard in the spring of 1838–1845, in response to the Rebellions of 1837. Commander William N. Fowell, then serving on the Mohawk, assumed command of all naval vessels on the lakes and he took up his residence in the "Commodore's Cottage" on Point Frederick 1845. On 3 April 1845, the dockyard was officially re-opened, in charge David Taylor, a clerk from 1845 to 1850. Lt. Commander Frederick Charles Herbert, was the last naval officer to command on Point Frederick 1850–1853. In 1853, the yard was completely closed, however it remained closed to the public since it still housed naval stores. The Fenian raids of 1866 brought another revival of naval power on the lakes. Vessels were hurriedly bought and armed and manned by sailors from the fleet who made use of the facilities at Point Frederick and of Navy Bay while patrolling from Montreal to Kingston. No permanent naval establishment on the lakes was set up when the danger receded.

== Museum ==
Fort Frederick, which is operated as the Royal Military College of Canada Museum, maintains a collection of artifacts and records relating to Kingston Royal Naval Dockyard which once occupied Point Frederick. A model by master modeler, Louis Roosen, depicting HMS St. Lawrence (1814), (mounting 102 guns) the only 1st Rate Royal Navy Ship-of-the-Line to sail on Lake Ontario during the War of 1812, was presented to the Royal Military College of Canada Commandant, Brigadier-General Tom Lawson on 22 April 2008. The model is approx 1.4 m (55 in) long and took over 4000 hours to complete.

== Ships built ==
The following ships were built and launched at the dockyard:

- Buffalo – gunboat 1792
- Catherine – gunboat 1792
- Sophia – gunboat 1792
- Governor Simcoe – schooner 1793
- Swift – gunboat 1798
- HMS Speedy 1798
- HMS Royal George 1809
- HMS St Lawrence 1814
- HMS Prince Regent 1814
- HMS Princess Charlotte 1814
- HMS Duke of Gloucester
- HMS Earl of Moira – brig 1805
- HMS Sir George Prevost – schooner 1813
- HMS Lord Melville – schooner 1813
- Psyche – frigate 1814
- Niagara – gunboat 1814-1843 (formerly known as Netley 1812)
- Queenston – gunboat 1814
- Crystler – gunboat 1814
- Kingston – gunboat 1814, steam vessel 1838
- Canada – unfinished 1815
- Wolfe – unfinished 1815
- Beckwith – transport 1816
- HMS Sir Isaac Brock – burned on stocks 1813
- Minos – steam vessel, 1840
- Cherokee – wooden paddle-wheel steam vessel 1841
- Mohawk – steam vessel 1843–1852
- Watertown – passenger vessel 1864

== See also ==
- Military history of Canada
