= Toronto Lake =

Toronto Lake may refer to:

== Lakes in Canada ==
- Toronto Lake (Muskoka District, Ontario)
- Toronto Lake (Rainy River District, Ontario)
- Toronto Lake (Thunder Bay District, Ontario)
- Toronto Lake (Northwest Territories)
- Lake Simcoe was referred to as Lake Taronto or Lake Toronto in the 19th century.

== Lakes in the United States ==
- Toronto Lake (Kansas)
- Toronto Lake (New York)
