= HMS Prince Regent (1814) =

Frigate of the Royal Navy

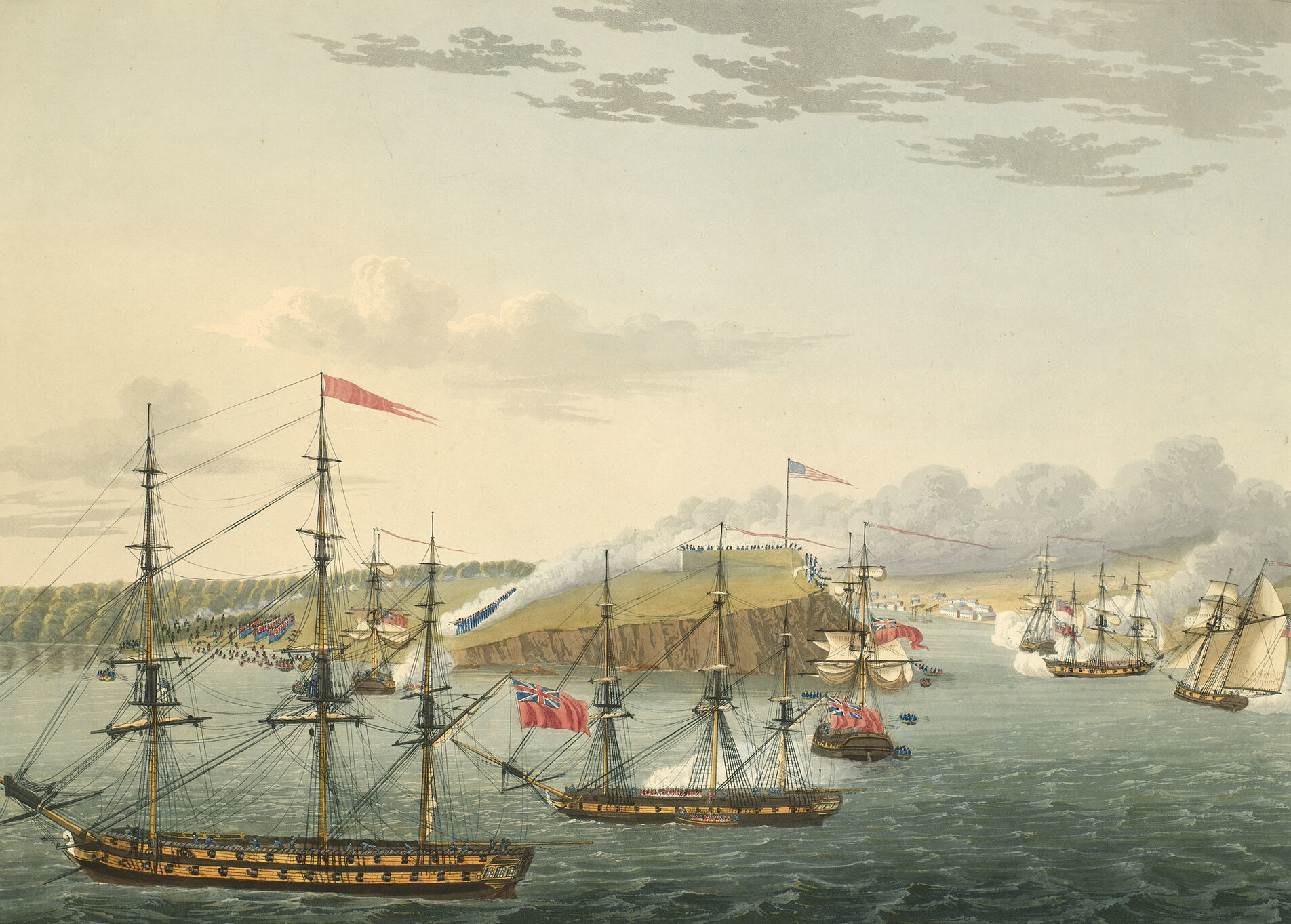
- Prince Regent (left) at the Battle of Fort Oswego in 1814

History

United Kingdom
- Name: Prince Regent
- Builder: Kingston Royal Naval Dockyard, Kingston
- Launched: 14 April 1814
- Renamed: Kingston on 9 December 1814
- Fate: Ordered to be sold in January 1832

General characteristics
- Type: Fourth-rate frigate
- Tons burthen: 1,293 50/94 bm
- Length: 155 ft 10 in (47.5 m) (overall); 131 ft 1 in (40.0 m) (keel)
- Beam: 43 ft 1 in (13.1 m)
- Draught: 17 ft 0 in (5.2 m)
- Depth of hold: 9 ft 2 in (2.8 m)
- Propulsion: Sails
- Sail plan: Full-rigged ship
- Complement: 280
- Armament: In 1814; Lower deck: 28 × 24 pdr (11 kg) long guns; Upper deck: 4 × 68 pdr (31 kg) carronades + 24 × 32 pdr (15 kg) carronades; By 1830: Lower deck: 30 × 24 pdrs; Upper deck: 2 × 24 pdrs + 6 × 68 pdr carronades + 22 × 32 pdr carronades

HMS Prince Regent was a 56-gun British warship that served on Lake Ontario during the War of 1812. Prince Regent was built at the Kingston Royal Naval Dockyard in Kingston, Upper Canada and launched on 14 April 1814. Rated as a fourth-rate frigate, Prince Regent took part in the Raid on Fort Oswego in 1814. Following the War of 1812 the frigate was renamed HMS Kingston on 9 December 1814. In 1817, the vessel was placed in reserve following the Rush-Bagot Treaty that demilitarized all the lakes along the United States-Canada border. Discarded in 1832, the vessel found no buyer and sank in Deadman Bay off Kingston after 1832.

== Description ==
Prince Regent, rated by the Royal Navy as a fourth-rate frigate, measured 1,293 tons burthen and was 131 ft 1 in (40.0 m) long at the keel and 155 ft 10 in (47.5 m) overall. (Note: Colledge & Warlow have the vessel's length at 161 ft (49.1 m).) Prince Regent was of similar design to HMS Leander and HMS Newcastle, constructed in 1813, and was the first frigate to ever be constructed on inland waters. The vessel had a beam of 43 ft 1 in (13.1 m) and a maximum draught of 17 ft 0 in (5.2 m). The frigate's depth of hold was 9 ft 2 in (2.8 m). A full-rigged ship, Prince Regent was armed with twenty-eight 24-pounder (11 kg) long guns on the lower deck and four 68-pounder (31 kg) carronades and twenty-four 32-pounder (15 kg) long guns on the upper deck at launch. By 1830, the armament had changed, with thirty 24-pounder long guns on the lower deck and two 24-pounder long guns, six 68-pounder carronades and twenty-two 32-pounder carronades on the upper deck. Prince Regent had a complement of 280.

== Service history ==
In September 1813, the commander-in-chief of British North America, Sir George Prevost approved further construction which was initially set to a brig, but was later revised to two frigates. This was in response to new vessels under construction by the Americans. By the third week of October 1813, work began on the second frigate. The design of the vessel is in dispute, with Malcomson stating that Patrick Fleming was the designer, with Master Shipwrights George Record and John Goudie sharing responsibility for construction, while Winfield states that it was Record who was named the designer though it was probably Goudie who actually designed the vessel while Patrick Fleming, Goudie's foreman, was responsible for the frigate's construction. The frigate was constructed at Kingston Royal Naval Dockyard in Kingston, Upper Canada. The construction of the vessel did result in the resignation of George Record, who was the master shipwright at Kingston and the frigate was built under private contract. Shortages of men and material at the shipyard led to construction delays. By January 1814, the frigate was completely planked and by February, had been caulked. Prince Regent was launched on 14 April 1814, a half hour after Princess Charlotte, the other frigate under construction. (Note: Colledge & Warlow and Lyon & Winfield have the frigate's launch on 15 April 1814.)

Prince Regent was made the flagship of Commodore Sir James Lucas Yeo's British squadron on Lake Ontario. Commander Richard O'Connor was advanced to the rank of post-captain and made Yeo's flag captain aboard Prince Regent. The squadron departed Kingston on 4 May with infantry and Royal Marines embarked for an attack on Fort Oswego. The squadron arrived on 5 May with the attack commencing at 06:00 on 6 May. O'Connor was in charge of the landing operation, getting the infantry into the bateaux and gunboats and to the shore. The town and fort were captured by the British late in the day. The British looted the town and returned to Kingston with their captured goods.

On 11 May, the squadron set out again, this time along the southern shore of Lake Ontario. On 19 May, Yeo put the naval blockade of Sackett's Harbor in place, pinning the American squadron under Commodore Issac Chauncey within their main naval base. Prince Regent was stationed off Stony Island. On 29 May, a British force that had been detached from Yeo's squadron, commanded by two of the squadron's captains and the majority of the crews of Montreal and Niagara, was defeated and captured at Sandy Creek. This significantly weakened the squadron. Yeo lifted the blockade on 5 June and returned to Kingston. The resulting command shuffle led to Captain Frederick Hickey taking over Prince Regent and becoming Yeo's flag captain. Following the disaster at Sandy Creek, the majority of the squadron, including Prince Regent, remained in Kingston's harbour for the remainder of the summer.

The arrival of the first-rate, St Lawrence on Lake Ontario led to another round of command changes. St Lawrence immediately became the new flagship, and Captain Hickey transferred to the new ship. Captain Henry Davies took command of Prince Regent, which came into effect on 1 October. On 16 October, the squadron sailed again with infantry reinforcements for Niagara embarked. On 19 October, while in transit to Niagara, Prince Regent was hit by lightning. The following day, the squadron arrived and began the disembarkation. St Lawrence's arrival led Chauncey withdrawing his squadron to Sackett's Harbor and never returned in force to Lake Ontario for the rest of the war. On 1 November, Prince Regent sailed as escort to a convoy transporting infantry reinforcements to Fort George. The vessel then sailed to York, Upper Canada to embark troops returning to Kingston.

Following the war, on 9 December 1814, the frigate was renamed Kingston. In January 1816, command of Kingston was given to Captain Sir Robert Hall. In 1817, Kingston was paid off into the ordinary as a result of the Rush-Bagot Treaty which demilitarized the Great Lakes. The vessel was ordered to be sold in January 1832. However, no buyers were found and the vessel sank in Deadman Bay in the mid-1830s. The wrecksite, along with those of St Lawrence and Princess Charlotte were designated a National Historic Site of Canada in 2015.

== See also ==
- Engagements on Lake Ontario

== Bibliography ==
- Colledge, J. J.; Warlow, Ben (2006) [1969]. Ships of the Royal Navy: The Complete Record of All Fighting Ships of the Royal Navy from the 15th Century to the Present (3rd Rev ed.). London: Chatham Publishing. ISBN 978-1-86176-281-8. OCLC 67375475.
- Lardas, Mark (2012). Great Lakes Warships 1812–1815. Oxford, UK: Osprey Publishing. ISBN 978-1-84908-566-3.
- Lyon, David; Winfield, Rif (2004). The Sail & Steam Navy List: All the Ships of the Royal Navy 1815–1889. London: Chatham Publishing. ISBN 1-86176-032-9.
- Malcomson, Robert (2001) [1998]. Lords of the Lake: The Naval War on Lake Ontario 1812–1814 (Paperback ed.). Toronto: Robin Brass Studio. ISBN 1-896941-24-9.
- Winfield, Rif (2005). British Warships in the Age of Sail 1793–1817: Design, Construction, Careers and Fates. Barnsley, UK: Seaforth Publishing. ISBN 1-86176-246-1.
