= HMS Psyche (1814) =

Frigate of the Royal Navy

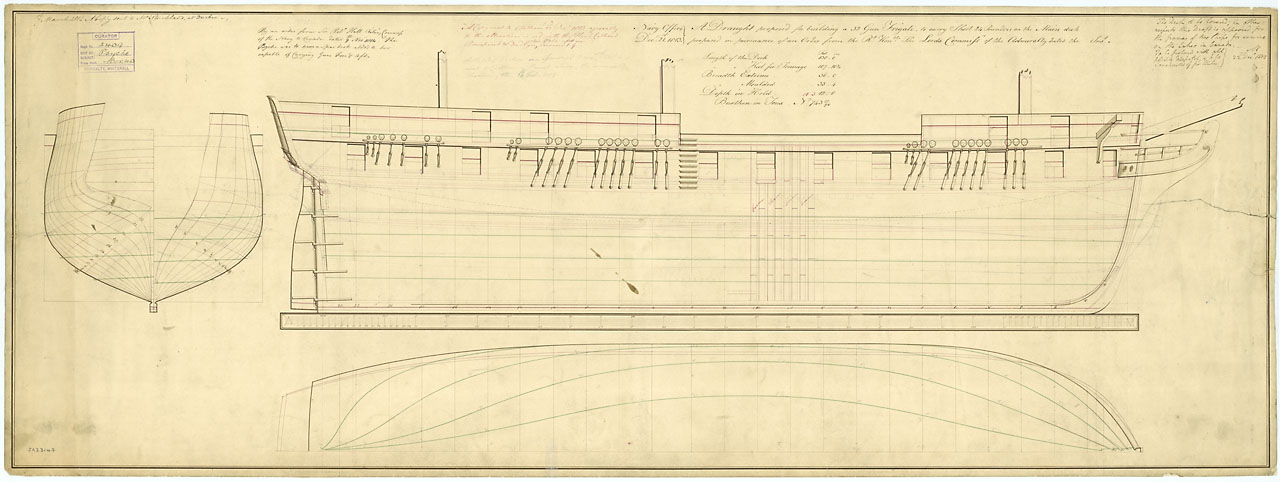
- Plan for the Psyche

History

United Kingdom
- Name: HMS Psyche
- Ordered: 1814
- Builder: Kingston Royal Naval Dockyard, Kingston, Upper Canada
- Laid down: 31 October 1814
- Launched: 25 December 1814
- Fate: Laid up in 1815 at Kingston

General characteristics
- Type: Fourth-rate frigate
- Tons burthen: 769 1/94 bm
- Length: 130 ft (39.6 m) pp; 121 ft (36.9 m) keel
- Beam: 36 ft 7 in (11.2 m)
- Draught: 9 ft 8 in (2.9 m)
- Depth of hold: 10 ft 3 in (3.1 m)
- Complement: 280
- Armament: 28 × 24 pdr (11 kg) long guns; 28 × 32 pdr (15 kg) carronades

HMS Psyche was a 54-gun fourth-rate frigate of the Royal Navy. She was built at the Kingston Royal Naval Dockyard in Kingston, Upper Canada during the War of 1812, using frames shipped from Britain and assembled in Upper Canada. The ship was not completed until after the end of the war in 1815 and did not enter service. Under the Rush–Bagot Treaty of 1816, the frigate was disarmed and laid up at Kingston. The ultimate fate of the ship is unknown.

== Background ==
As the balance of power on the Great Lakes during the War of 1812 shifted between British and American forces, the naval effort turned to one of preservation. The opposing commanders on the Great Lakes, Sir James Yeo and Isaac Chauncey sought to build larger vessels to overpower the other while preventing an attack on their lines of communication. The ships that were constructed at Kingston, Upper Canada were similar in design to those being built for war on the oceans. In an effort to bolster the British squadron on the Great Lakes in 1813 following the loss at the Battle of Lake Erie, the British government created a plan where four pre-fabricated warships would be constructed in shipyards in Great Britain, dismantled and transported to Lower Canada where the vessels would be then transported up the Saint Lawrence River to Kingston for re-assembly. This plan came about due to the excess of material, builders and facilities available in Great Britain and all lacking in Upper Canada.

The plan was rejected by General Sir George Prevost, commander of British forces in North America, believing that the idea would strain British supply lines between Montreal, Lower Canada and Kingston. The idea was resurrected in 1814 by the British government. Prevost turned to his officers and they recommended the plan once again be halted due to the impracticality of the transportation of warships. The lack of material on the Great Lakes made it impossible to provide all the fittings and stores the ships would require and the special requirements that would be needed to transport the frames from Montreal to Kingston would be in danger of American attack. Prevost sent the rejection to London, but it arrived nearly two months after the first components of the warships had landed at Montreal.

== Construction and description ==
Two vessels were designed to be a 38-gun frigates known as Prompte and Psyche. The frames of the frigates were constructed out of fir, an inferior material which was not suitable for sea-going ships. The vessels were built in Great Britain at Chatham dockyard and dismantled. The pieces were transported across the Atlantic, the first of which landed at Montreal in June 1814. Prevost attempted to ease strain on government supply lines by hiring the private contractor William Forbes to move Frigate B (Psyche) up the Saint Lawrence River to be assembled at Kingston. It was reported that this effort cost the Royal Navy £300,000. The decision by the Admiralty was based upon the belief that there was a lack of suitable white pine growing around Kingston to build frigates this large. Meanwhile, after receiving Prevost's communications nixing the plan, the Admiralty re-directed the two pre-fabricated sloops to Halifax, Nova Scotia and cancelled the construction of the frigates. However, once again the decision arrived late at its destination, not being received by Prevost until October when Frigate B was nearly completed.

The speed at which William Forbes and his workers transported the frames of Frigate B to Kingston earned him a £1,000 bonus. Master Shipwright Thomas Strickland had been sent from Great Britain to take control of the construction project. With Sir James Yeo and Point Frederick yard commissioner Robert Hall, Strickland re-designed Frigate B, completely planking the upper deck, creating a spar deck which allowed an increase of armament from 38 to 56 guns. As built, Frigate B was 130 feet (39.6 m) long between perpendiculars and 121 feet (36.9 m) long at the keel. The vessel had a beam of 36 feet 7 inches (11.2 m), a depth of hold of 10 feet 3 inches (3.1 m) and a draught of 9 feet 8 inches (2.9 m). The frigate measured 769 1/94 tons burthen and had a complement of 280 officers and sailors. Frigate B was armed with 28 24-pounder (11 kg) long guns on its lower deck and 28 32-pounder (15 kg) carronades on its upper deck.

== Service history ==
Frigate B's keel was laid down on 31 October 1814 at Kingston Royal Naval Dockyard in Kingston. The frigate was launched on 25 December 1814 and was completed in early 1815. The launch of Psyche would mark that last major warship to begin its career during the War of 1812. Named Psyche, the frigate joined the Lake Ontario squadron under Sir James Yeo. On 19 March 1815, Yeo was replaced by Commodore Edward Owen who raised his pennant in Psyche.

Following the end of the war in 1815 Psyche was hauled out and placed on a slipway, the frame stripped down for preservation. The Rush–Bagot Treaty of 1816 limited the navies on the Great Lakes to one gunboat armed with one gun, which led to the remaining fleet being disarmed. The frigate remained in this condition until 1827, when, declining funds and the poor condition of the existing fleet led the Naval Commissioner to abandon hopes of refitting the existing vessels and instead start new construction. Beginning in 1832, all the vessels at Kingston were sold under the Whig government and the dockyard closed in 1835. Psyche was pulled apart on the slipway at Kingston throughout the 1830s. Those hulks that were not sold were either left to rot at Navy Bay or taken around Point Henry to Hamilton Bay and scuttled there. The exact fate is uncertain. Colledge & Warlow have the hulk being sold. Lardas claims the hulk sank at its moorings in the late 1830s. Winfield states the vessel shared the fate of HMS Kingston and was taken to Deadman Bay off Kingston and sunk there.

== Sources ==
- Colledge, J. J. & Warlow, Ben (2006) [1969]. Ships of the Royal Navy: The Complete Record of all Fighting Ships of the Royal Navy (Revised ed.). London: Chatham Publishing. ISBN 978-1-86176-281-8. OCLC 67375475.
- Lardas, Mark (2012). Great Lakes Warships 1812–1815. New Vanguard. Oxford, UK: Osprey Publishing. ISBN 978-1-78096-048-7.
- Malcomson, Robert (2001) [1998]. Lords of the Lake: The Naval War on Lake Ontario 1812–1814 (Paperback ed.). Toronto: Robin Brass Studio. ISBN 1-896941-24-9.
- "The 'Bones' of Deadman Bay". The Crowsnest. Vol. 5, no. 4. Ottawa, Ontario: Queen's Printer. February 1953. ISSN 0704-7185.
- Winfield, Rif (2005). British Warships in the Age of Sail 1793–1817: Design, Construction, Careers and Fates. Barnsley, UK: Seaforth Publishing. ISBN 1-86176-246-1.
