= Seneca (1812 ship) =

Seneca was a merchant schooner that the Provincial Marine commandeered at the outbreak of the War of 1812. She belonged to an American owner, Ebeneezer Hubbard, and the British seized her at Kingston, Ontario on 25 June 1812. She may have been armed with two guns, and Commodore Isaac Chauncey at one point reported that she was armed with 4 guns and had a crew of 40 men. On 2 November she was at York undergoing a survey of her stores. On 21 November cannon fire from Fort Niagara sank her as she lay in the Niagara River under Navy Hall.
