= HMS Toronto (1799) =

Schooner of the Provincial Marine

History

Great Britain
- Name: Toronto
- Operator: Provincial Marine
- Builder: John Dennis, York
- Launched: September 1799
- Fate: Wrecked 1811

General characteristics
- Type: Schooner
- Sail plan: Schooner-rigged

Toronto was a schooner of the Provincial Marine, built by John Dennis on the Humber River at York (Toronto), Upper Canada that entered service in 1799 on the Great Lakes. The ship was built to ferry government officials from York to Upper Canada's former capital of Newark (Niagara on the Lake). The ship's career was short; she was wrecked in 1811 off Hanlan's Point and was broken up.

== Description ==
In the late 1790s, the Lieutenant Governor of Upper Canada Peter Hunter made a request to his superiors for funds to construct a new vessel on Lake Ontario for the express purpose of shuttling government officials between meetings in Upper Canada. Government business had been delayed by the lack of transportation and Hunter sought to remedy this by building a vessel for exclusive use by officials. The request was granted and Hunter sought out John Dennis to construct the vessel. Dennis designed a yacht that was rigged as a schooner. The ship was considered good looking for the time. Toronto had a crew of seven.

== Service ==
Dennis used his personal holdings located by the Humber River at York, Upper Canada to construct the ship. The ship was launched in August or September 1799. (Note: The sources disagree on when the ship was launched. Malcolmson states both 1798 and September 1799 and Colledge & Warlow stated August 1799.) Used expressly for government service, Toronto could also take on private cargo at a charge. First commanded by Captain William Baker, in 1800, Lieutenant William Earle of the Provincial Marine took over.

In 1811, Toronto was wrecked off Hanlan's Point. She lay along the shore, out of service. In response, the government began using the brig Duke of Gloucester for government transport. Toronto was later broken up where it had been wrecked, with the iron fittings being used in other ship construction on the Great Lakes.
