= HMS Cockburn (1822) =

Schooner of the Royal Navy

History

United Kingdom
- Name: HMS Cockburn
- Namesake: Sir George Cockburn, 10th Baronet
- Acquired: 1822 by purchase
- Fate: Wrecked 2 April 1823

General characteristics
- Tons burthen: 160 (bm)

HMS Cockburn was a schooner, the former American steam vessel Braganza, that the Royal Navy purchased at Rio de Janeiro in May 1822. She was wrecked 11 months later.

HMS Leven towed Cockburn from Rio de Janeiro to Cape Town. On 22 June the tow resulted in Cockburn taking on water, a problem that did not abate until the tow broke.

In August 1822 Cockburn was at Cape Town, undergoing fitting to serve as a tender to Leven, the purpose for which she had been purchased. The preparations, including provisioning for eight months for both Cockburn and Barracouta.

In December Cockburn, Lieutenant R. Owen, was in Delagoa Bay, expecting to return to the Cape in February. (Note: Lieutenant Richard Owen was Richard Owen, who had been appointed to Leven on 14 November 1821.)

Loss: On 2 April 1823 HMS Cockburn, Lieutenant Owen, was attempting to enter Simon's Bay, Cape Colony, when Owen mistook the land. She anchored off Musenberg beach, but a strong wind drove her onshore at 4am on 3 April. All her crew were saved but it was doubted that she could be retrieved. Her masts were cut away and her rudder was lost.
