= HMS Netley =

At least six vessels of the Royal Navy have borne the name HMS Netley, named for the village of Netley.

- HMS Netley (1798) was launched in 1798. The French captured her in 1806, and she became the 21-gun privateer Duquesne. In 1807 HMS Blonde captured Duquesne, which the Royal Navy returned to service as the 12-gun gun-brig HMS Unique. She was expended in an unsuccessful fireship attack at Guadeloupe in 1809.
- HMS Netley (1807) was the French privateer brig Déterminée, which HMS Venus captured in 1807. The British took her into service as HMS Netley; she capsized on 10 July 1808 while on the Leeward Islands station.
- HMS Netley (1808) was the American schooner Nimrod launched in 1804 that the Royal Navy captured in 1807 and purchased in 1808. She was broken up in 1814.
- HMS Netley was a 16-gun schooner launched as Prince Regent in 1812 for the Provincial Marine on Lake Ontario. In 1813 the vessel was renamed HMS Beresford (or General Beresford, or Lord Beresford) when the Royal Navy took over the Provincial Marine. She was re-rigged as a brig in 1814 and renamed Netley, after Admiralty policy being not to name vessels after living people. She was broken up in the 1830s.
- HMS Netley (1823) was a former revenue cutter of eight guns, that served as a tender to various vessels until c.1859.
- HMS Netley (1866) was a Britomart-class gunboat built at Portsmouth. She was sold for breaking up in 1885.
