= Toronto space =

Type of topological space

In mathematics, in the realm of point-set topology, a Toronto space is a topological space that is homeomorphic to every proper subspace of the same cardinality.

There are five homeomorphism classes of countable Toronto spaces, namely: the discrete topology, the indiscrete topology, the cofinite topology and the upper and lower topologies on the natural numbers. The only countable Hausdorff Toronto space is the discrete space.

The Toronto space problem asks for an uncountable Toronto Hausdorff space that is not discrete.
