= Toronto Lake (New York) =

Lake in New York, United States

- Location within New York Location within the United States
- Location: Sullivan County, New York
- Coordinates: 41°37′48″N 74°52′55″W
- Basin countries: United States
- Surface area: 81 acres (33 ha)
- Surface elevation: 1,260 ft (384 m)

Toronto Lake is a lake in Sullivan County, New York. It is located in the town of Bethel.
