= HMCS Toronto =

HMCS Toronto may refer to:

- HMCS Toronto (K538) was a River-class frigate that served in the Second World War. It was sold in 1956.
- HMCS Toronto (FFH 333) is a Halifax-class frigate that has served since 1993.

== Battle honours ==
- Gulf of St. Lawrence, 1944
- Arabian Sea

== See also ==
- HMS Toronto
