= HMS St Lawrence (1814) =

First-rate wooden warship of the Royal Navy that served on Lake Ontario

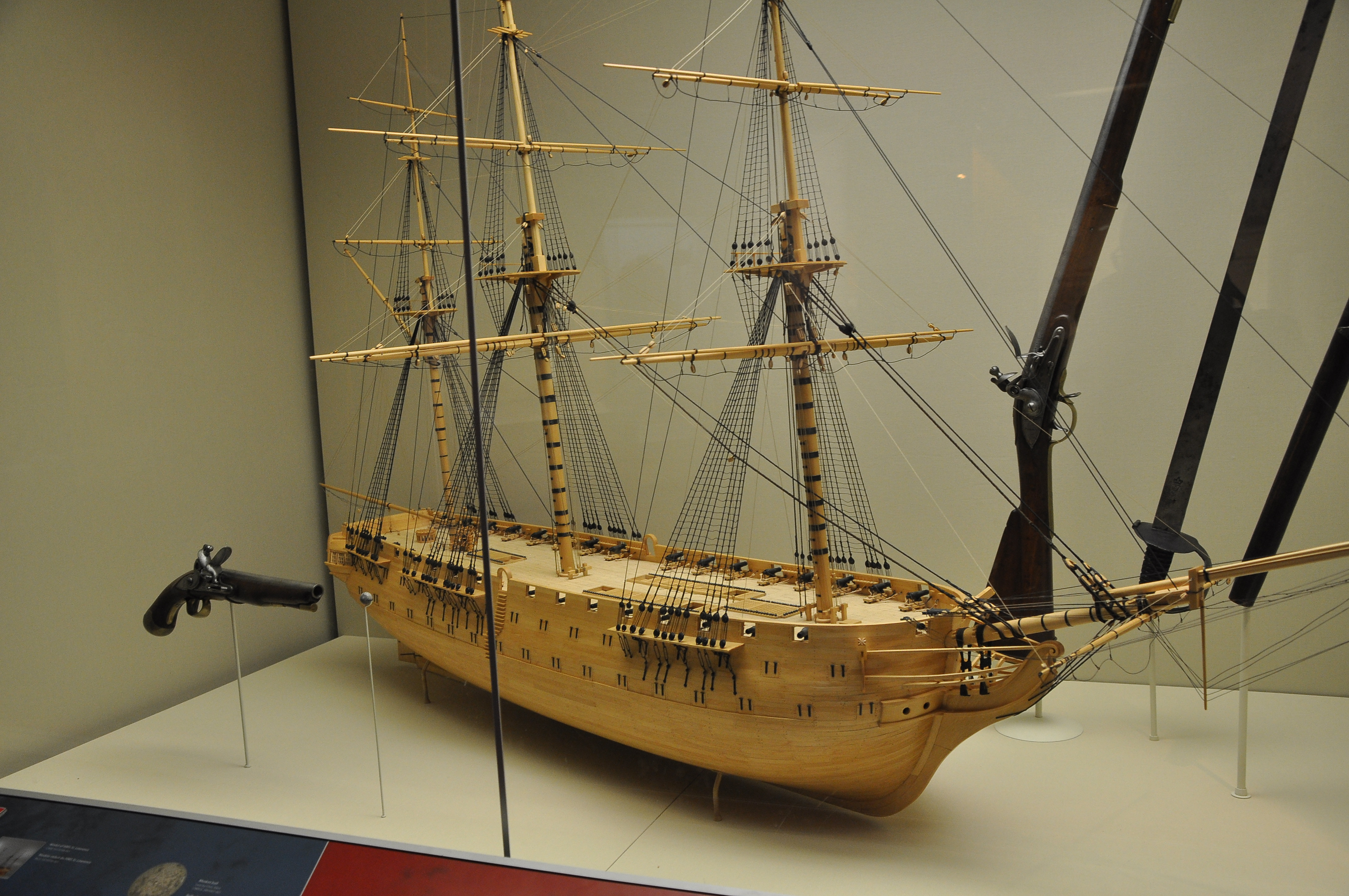
- Model of HMS St Lawrence

History

United Kingdom
- Name: St Lawrence
- Builder: Kingston Royal Naval Dockyard, Kingston
- Laid down: 12 April 1814
- Launched: 10 September 1814
- Decommissioned: 1815
- Fate: Sold, 1832

General characteristics
- Type: Ship of the line
- Tons burthen: 2,304 90/94 bm
- Length: 194 ft 2 in (59.18 m) (gun deck length)
- Beam: 52 ft 7 in (16.03 m)
- Complement: 700
- Armament: 112 guns: Gun deck: 28 × 32 pdrs, 4 × 24 pdrs, 2 × 68 pdr carronades; Middle gun deck: 36 × 24 pdrs; Upper gun deck: 32 × 32 pdr carronades, 2 × 68 pdr carronades

National Historic Site of Canada
- Designated: 2015

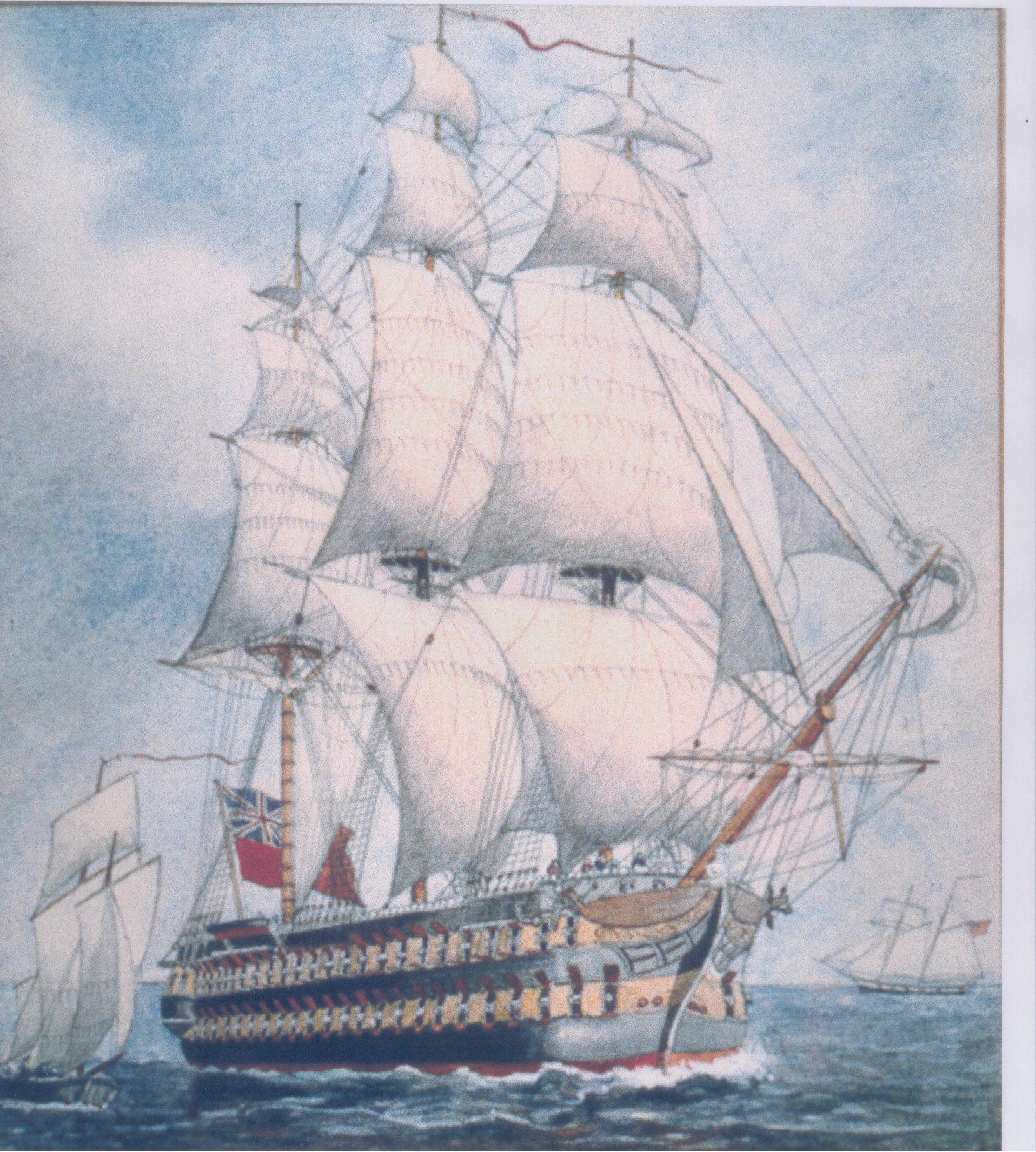

HMS St Lawrence was a 112-gun first-rate ship of the line of the Royal Navy that served on Lake Ontario during the War of 1812. Built on the lake at the Royal Navy dockyard in Kingston, Upper Canada, she was the only Royal Navy ship of the line ever to be launched and operated entirely in fresh water. Constructed in 1814, the ship's arrival on the lake ended all naval action and St Lawrence finished the war having never gone into battle. Following the war, the vessel was laid up, eventually being sold in 1832 to private interests. The ship later sank and is now a recreational dive spot.

== Description ==
Master shipbuilder John Dennis and nearly 200 shipwrights built St Lawrence in under ten months, although several sources credit master shipwright William Bell as the designer and builder. Unlike sea-going ships of the line, St Lawrence was constructed without a quarterdeck, poop deck or forecastle. This gave the vessel the appearance of a spar-deck frigate. Furthermore, St Lawrence was not expected to make long ocean voyages and did not have to carry the same amount of stores and provisions. This allowed the designers to make savings in the vessel's capacity. The shipwrights constructed a vessel larger and more heavily gunned than the flagship of Horatio Nelson at the Battle of Trafalgar, HMS Victory.

As built St Lawrence measured 2,304 90/94 tons burthen, with a gundeck of 194 feet 2 inches (59.18 m), and beam of 52 feet 7 inches (16.03 m) – all larger than the 102-gun Victory.

The crew numbered 700. She carried thirty-two 32-pounder carronades and two 68-pounder carronades on the upper deck, thirty-six 24-pounder long guns on the middle deck and twenty-eight 32-pounder long guns, four 24-pounder long guns and two 68-pounder carronades on the lower deck.

== Service history ==
The ship was ordered to remedy the imbalance between the Royal Navy and United States naval forces under the command of Isaac Chauncey on landlocked Lake Ontario.

At the time, Lake Ontario was effectively landlocked for any but the smallest vessels, due to shallow water and rapids on the St. Lawrence River downstream and Niagara Falls upstream. As a result, warships operating on Lake Ontario had to be built on site, either in Kingston or in the American naval dockyards at Sackets Harbor, or converted from merchant ships already operating in the lake.

Control of the lake, which was the most important supply route for the British for military operations to the west, had passed back and forth between the Americans and the British over the course of the war. The construction of a first rate ship of the line, in a campaign that had been dominated by sloops and frigates, gave the British uncontested control of the lake during the final months of the war. HMS St Lawrence never saw action, because her presence on the lake once battle-ready deterred the U.S. fleet from setting sail.

St Lawrence's keel was laid on 12 April 1814. The construction of the ship took a toll on British resources in the area, affecting supply levels throughout the region during the spring and summer. Projected launch dates in June, July and August were missed and in order to provide all of the gear for a ship of this size, the 74-gun ships of the line HMS Ajax, HMS Centaur and HMS Warspite were stripped at Montreal and the material brought to Kingston.

St Lawrence was launched on 10 September 1814. British naval commodore Sir James Lucas Yeo commissioned her as his flagship, with Captain Frederick Hickey as Flag Captain, in the Kingston Royal Naval Dockyard in Kingston, Upper Canada. The ship cost Britain £500,000. The day after the ship's launch, an American fleet under Chauncey appeared off Kingston and offered to battle, which the British declined. The vessel did not put to sea until 16 October, making several trips around Lake Ontario. On 19 October, she was struck by lightning, damaging the mast and killing several of the crew. The Americans made an attempt to blow St Lawrence up in Kingston harbour using a "torpedo" which was much more like a floating naval mine. The British drove the attackers off before they could make a serious attempt on the vessel.

After the war ended in 1815, the ship was decommissioned. In January 1832, the hull was sold to Robert Drummond for £25. Between May and August, the hull was towed out of Navy Bay. It later formed the end of a pier attached to Morton's Brewery in Kingston and was used as a storage facility by the brewery, for cordwood among other materials. Later, it sank, or was scuttled to prevent its timbers from further decay, in 30 feet (9.1 m) of water close to shore at 44°13′14″N 76°30′18″W. The vessel's remains rotted away until as of 2009, only its keel and ribs of its frame remain. The wrecksite, along with those of Princess Charlotte and Prince Regent, were designated a National Historic Site of Canada in 2015.

== Model ==
The Royal Military College of Canada Museum in Kingston, Ontario, has a scale model of HMS St Lawrence, built by master modeller Louis Roosen.
