= James Lucas Yeo =

Royal Navy officer (1782–1818)

Captain Sir James Lucas Yeo KCB
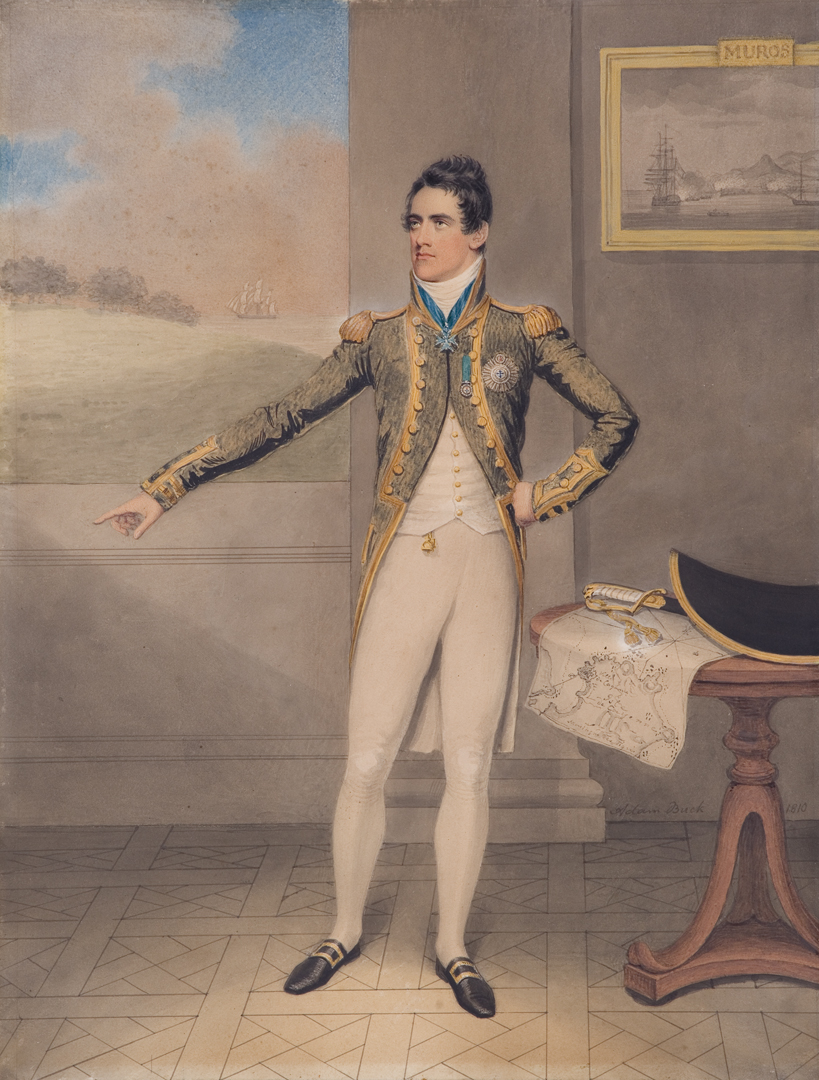
- 1810 portrait of Yeo by Adam Buck
- Born: 7 October 1782; Southampton, Hampshire
- Died: 21 August 1818 (aged 35); Atlantic Ocean
- Burial place: Portsmouth
- Military career
- Allegiance: Kingdom of Great Britain; United Kingdom
- Branch: Royal Navy
- Service years: 1792–1818
- Rank: Captain
- Conflicts: Napoleonic Wars; Invasion of Cayenne; Action of 3 February 1812; War of 1812; Engagements on Lake Ontario; Second Battle of Sacket's Harbor; Battle of Fort Oswego
- Awards: Knight Commander of the Order of the Bath 1815; Knight Bachelor 1810; Knight Commander of the Royal Portuguese Military Order of St. Bento d'Avis 1809 (Note: Memoir of the Public Services of Sir James Lucas Yeo, Knt.)

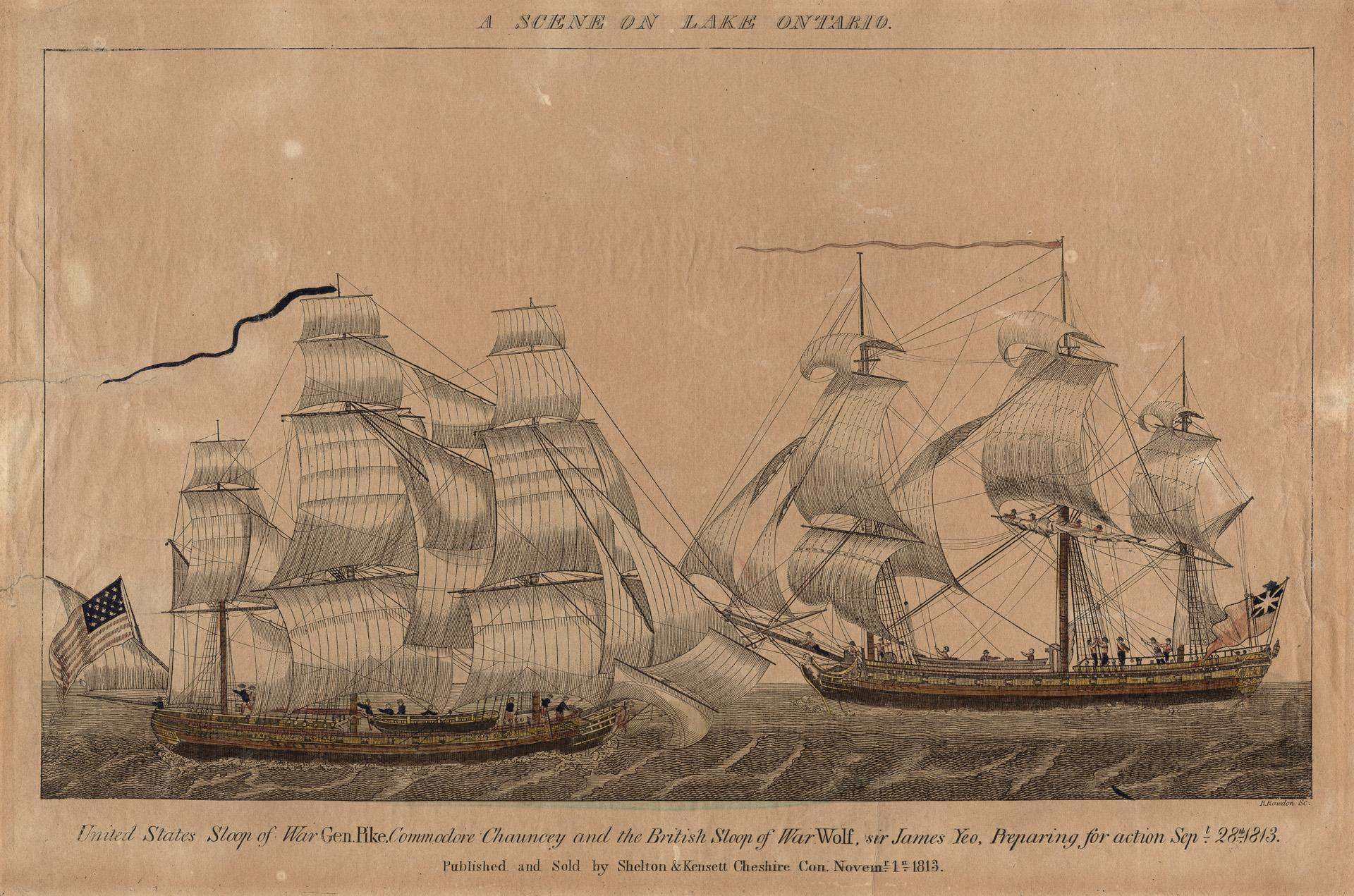
A scene on Lake Ontario – United States sloop of war Gen. Pike, Commodore Chauncey, and the British sloop of war Wolfe, Sir James Lucas Yeo, preparing for action, 28 September 1813

Sir James Lucas Yeo, KCB (7 October 1782 – 21 August 1818) was a Royal Navy officer who served in the French Revolutionary and Napoleonic Wars and the War of 1812. Born in Southampton, Hampshire, he joined the British navy at the age of 10 and saw his first action in the Adriatic Sea. Yeo distinguished himself in combat multiple times, most notably during the Portuguese conquest of French Guiana, earning knighthoods in the Portuguese Order of Aviz and the British Order of the Bath. He was subsequently given command of the frigate Southampton in 1812, but she was later wrecked in the Bahamas, although he was acquitted of blame for its loss. Yeo was then given command of the British squadron on Lake Ontario and commanded it in several engagements on Lake Ontario with American forces. He died off the African coast in 1818.

== Service history ==
=== Early life and career ===
Yeo was born in Southampton, England on 7 October 1782 to a naval victualling agent. Yeo was sent to an academy near Winchester for his formal education. Yeo joined the Royal Navy as a midshipman aboard Windsor Castle at the age of 10, thanks to his patron, Admiral Phillips Crosby. In 1796, he was made acting-lieutenant and placed in command of the 16-gun sloop Albacore. He was made lieutenant permanently on 20 February 1797. The vessel was deployed to the West Indies, where Yeo contracted Yellow fever and was ordered home to England to convalesce in 1798. By 1802, Yeo was first lieutenant aboard Genereux in the Adriatic Sea. He distinguished himself during the siege of Cesenatico in 1800, when thirteen merchant vessels were burned or sunk. Following the Peace of Amiens in 1802, Yeo was demoted to half-pay.

=== Napoleonic Wars ===
Once war began again between Britain and France in 1805, Yeo became first lieutenant of the frigate Loire. The frigate was patrolling off the northwest coast of Spain when Loire's commanding officer, Captain F.L. Maitland, chose to attack shipping in Muros Bay, Spain. Lieutenant Yeo led fifty men ashore to attack a shore battery that was firing on the frigate. Once there, they found a second, more powerful emplacement and captured that one too. During the battle, Yeo was stabbed with a bayonet. The Spanish suffered over forty casualties in the engagement, the British six. Loire captured three vessels at Muros Bay including the 22-gun corvette Confiance. As a reward, he was promoted to commander on 21 June and given the command of the captured Confiance, which had been taken into Royal Navy service.

In 1807, Confiance was part of Admiral Sidney Smith's fleet off Portugal. Confiance transported Percy Smythe, 6th Viscount Strangford to Lisbon to negotiate an alliance with Britain. Lord Strangford also negotiated the passage of the Portuguese Prince Regent Dom João and the Portuguese royal family to Brazil. Yeo was ordered by Admiral Smith to bring word of Strangford's success to Britain, an honour that led Yeo being named to the list of post-captains. Due to his rank, Confiance was reclassified as a post-ship. The following year, Confiance was part of Smith's fleet stationed off Brazil.

Yeo was ordered by Smith to bring dispatches to a Portuguese general from whom he learned of French privateers based at Cayenne, French Guiana. On 6 January 1809, he took command of a small force consisting of Confiance, two Portuguese brigs, and 550 Portuguese soldiers. With them he captured Cayenne, a fortified position of two hundred guns, and took a thousand prisoners. The conquest of French Guiana would remove the French from their last South American colony. During the operation, Yeo was among the many British who became sick. In 1810, he was knighted for his services at Cayenne, both by the Portuguese who decreed him a member of the Order of Aviz and the British, who decreed him a knight commander of the Order of the Bath and was given his own coat-of-arms. Yeo was the first Protestant to be made a member of the Order of Aviz.

In 1811 Yeo was given command of the frigate Southampton. The frigate was ordered to Jamaica where it joined the fleet of Vice Admiral Charles Stirling. In 1812, he was stationed in the Bahamas. There he captured the privateer Heureuse Réunion, a brig and a corvette in the action of 3 February 1812, and the American brig Vixen in November 1812. However, shortly afterwards Southampton and Vixen were wrecked in the Crooked Island passage, although there were no deaths. As was customary in the case of the loss of a ship from any cause, Yeo was court martialled, but the court accepted that the reef on which he was wrecked was not charted, nor were the local currents documented, and Yeo was exonerated.

=== War of 1812 ===
The importance of the naval warfare on the Great Lakes raised "The Lakes Service" to the status of a Flag Command and Kingston was the Commodore's headquarters. Yeo was sent to Canada in 1813 aboard Woolwich to command the British naval forces in the Great Lakes. He was appointed commodore of the fleet on Lake Ontario. Yeo's use of his small navy was always determined and skillful, but he was hampered by a lack of cooperation from the British army. The commander of these forces, Sir George Prevost, failed to follow up key advances made by Yeo at Sackett's Harbour and elsewhere that might have resulted in major British victories. On the whole, historians regard the war on Lake Ontario as having been a draw. During 1814 both Yeo and Isaac Chauncey, the American commander, tried to out build the other. Yeo captured Oswego, New York and then blockaded Sacketts Harbour on 6 May 1814, when reinforced by two frigates built on Point Frederick. During the final months of the war, Yeo ensured British control of the lake by the 1814 launch of St. Lawrence, a 112-gun first rate ship of the line built in Kingston specifically for use on the lake, a three-decker man-of-war, and he had two more building. The Americans also had two first line men-o'-war on the stocks.

In August 1815, Yeo was posted to Inconstant, 36 guns, at Plymouth. After the British-American War, Yeo held important commands on the West African and Caribbean stations, but saw no further action. He died in 1818 at the age of 35, while returning from Jamaica to England.

== Legacy ==
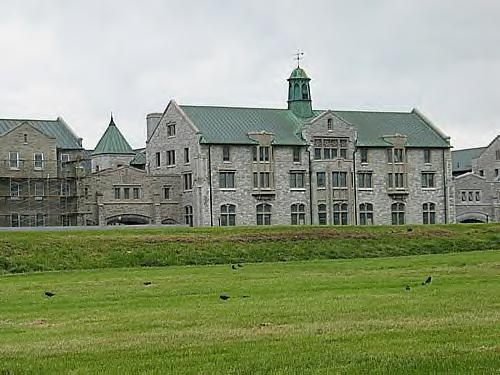
Yeo Hall, Royal Military College of Canada

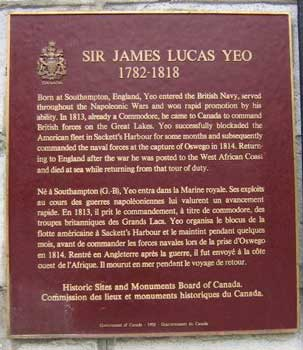
Sir James Lucas Yeo plaque at the Royal Military College of Canada

The Yeo Hall at the Royal Military College of Canada in Kingston, Ontario was named in his honour in 1936. This multifunctional building houses the Cadet Dining Hall and the Cadet Mess. The barber and Canadian Forces Exchange System (CANEX) are located in the basement. A plaque erected by the Historic Sites and Monuments Board of Canada at the Royal Military College of Canada states "Born in Southampton, England, Yeo entered the British Navy, served throughout the Napoleonic Wars and won rapid promotion by his ability. In 1813, already a Commodore, he came to Canada to command British forces on the Great Lakes. Yeo successfully blockaded the American fleet in Sackett's Harbour for some months and subsequently commanded the naval forces at the capture of Oswego in 1814. Returning to England after the war he was posted to the West African Coast and died at sea while returning from that tour of duty."

Yeo was one of the actual historical officers on whom C. S. Forester modeled his fictional naval hero Horatio Hornblower. Forester briefly mentions him in the 1946 novel Lord Hornblower. (Note: The opening scene is a church service for members of the Order of the Bath, attended by a number of prominent historical naval officers, including Yeo, although the novel is set in 1813, when Yeo was in Canada and before he became a Knight of the Bath. "Lord St. Vincent, huge and grim, the man who took his fleet down into the heart of a Spanish squadron twice its strength; Duncan, who destroyed the Dutch Navy at Camperdown; and a dozen more of admirals and captains, some of them even junior to him in the Navy List--Lydiard, who captured the Pomona off Havannah; Samuel Hood, who commanded the Zealous at the Nile; and Yeo, who stormed the fort at El Muro.")

== Sources ==
- Chartrand, Rene (25 November 2000). The Portuguese Army of the Napoleonic Wars. Osprey Publishing. p. 40. ISBN 978-1-85-532981-2. "Reference to Captain James Yeo award with date and unit"
- Forester, Cecil (1946). Lord Hornblower. London: Michael Joseph. OCLC 16481131.
- Laughton, John Knox (1900). "Yeo, James Lucas" . In Lee, Sidney (ed.). Dictionary of National Biography. Vol. 63. London: Smith, Elder & Co.
- Malcomson, Robert (2001) [1998]. Lords of the Lake: The Naval War on Lake Ontario 1812–1814 (Paperback ed.). Toronto: Robin Brass Studio. ISBN 1-896941-24-9.
- Spurr, John W. (1983). "Yeo, Sir James Lucas". In Halpenny, Francess G. (ed.). Dictionary of Canadian Biography. Vol. V (1801–1820) (online ed.). University of Toronto Press.
- The Naval Chronicle, vol. 24, London: Joyce Gold, 1810
