= Engagements on Lake Ontario =

Naval battles during the War of 1812

- Part of the War of 1812
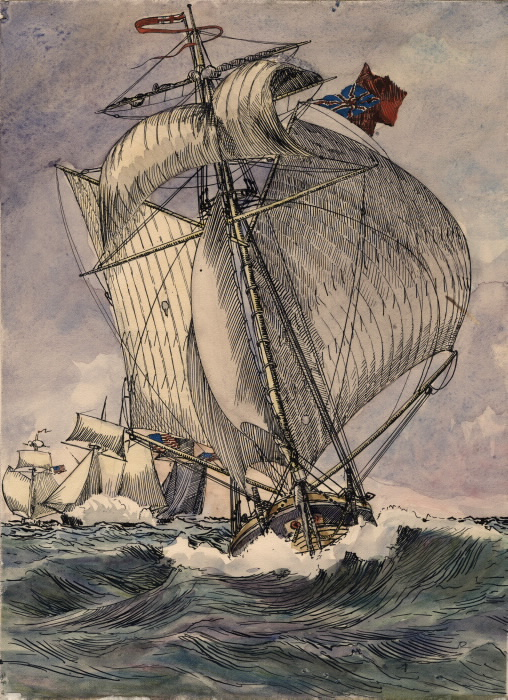
- Governor Simcoe pursued by American ships off Kingston, Upper Canada
Location	Lake Ontario
Result	Indecisive

Belligerents
United Kingdom	United States

Commanders and leaders
James Lucas Yeo	Isaac Chauncey

Strength
1 first rate ship of the line 2 frigates 6 sloops and brigs 4 schooners and gunboats	2 frigates 6 sloops and brigs 12 schooners and gunboats

Casualties and losses
1 sloop destroyed 2 brigs destroyed 1 brig captured (Note: These include vessels lost while serving or being constructed as warships only, not as transports, tenders etc.)	1 brig destroyed 2 schooners sunk 2 schooners captured

British and American forces fought several engagements on Lake Ontario for control of the lake during the War of 1812. Ultimately, only a few actions were fought, none of which had decisive results. The contest essentially became a naval building race, sometimes referred to sarcastically as the "Battle of the Carpenters".

== Operations in 1812 ==
When war was first declared, the British had an early advantage on the Great Lakes in that they possessed a quasi-naval body, the Provincial Marine. Although not particularly well manned or efficient, its ships were initially unopposed on Lake Erie and Lake Huron, and made possible the decisive early victories of Major General Isaac Brock.

On Lake Ontario, they possessed the ships Royal George and Prince Regent, and the brigs Earl of Moira and Duke of Gloucester, based at the Kingston Royal Naval Dockyard. The schooners Seneca and Governor Simcoe were also taken into service. The chief officer was Commodore John Steel, who was seventy-five years old, or even older. He was retired and replaced by Commander Hugh Earle. The Americans possessed only one brig, Oneida under Lieutenant Melancthon Taylor Woolsey, and a small navy yard at Sackets Harbor, New York. On 19 July, five vessels of the Provincial Marine attacked Oneida in the First Battle of Sackett's Harbor but were beaten off.

To redress matters, on 3 September, the United States Navy appointed Commodore Isaac Chauncey, then commanding the New York Navy Yard, to command on the lakes. Although Chauncey was nominally in charge of the naval force on Lake Erie also, he took little part in its construction or operations there but concentrated his attention on Lake Ontario. To supplement Oneida, he first purchased or commandeered several trading vessels (including some captured Canadian schooners), but he also dispatched thousands of carpenters, shipwrights and so on to Sacket's Harbor to construct proper fighting ships. The chief architects were Adam Brown, his brother Noah, and Henry Eckford. They launched their first new ship, the corvette Madison, on 26 November. The trees from which it was constructed had still been standing in September.

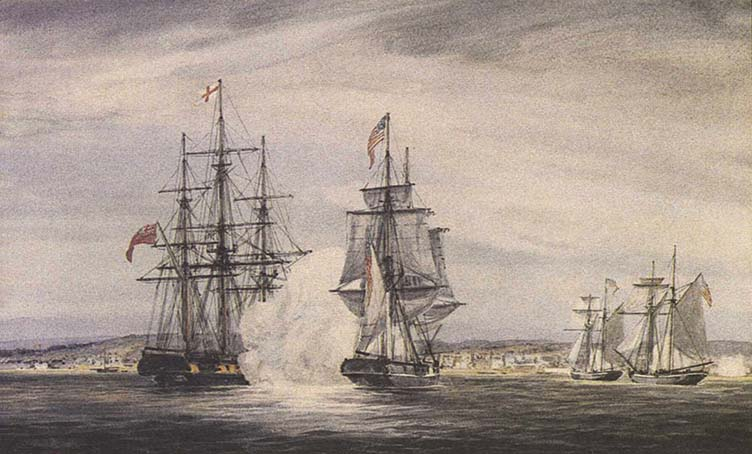
On 6 November, Commodore Issac Chauncey pursued HMS Royal George to Kingston, before his squadron was beaten off by other gunboats and British shore batteries.

Chauncey hoisted his broad pendant aboard Oneida on 6 November and with his squadron, pursued the British ship Royal George into Kingston. In the Battle of Kingston Harbour, he was beaten off, partly by shore batteries and gunboats, and partly because a gun exploded aboard the schooner Pert, mortally injuring the schooner's commander and throwing the American squadron into confusion. After this engagement winter closed in, immobilising the ships of both sides in port. Chauncey feared an attack across the ice by British regular soldiers, and kept his carpenters sawing the ice from around his vessels so that they could be slewed to bring fire to bear on any attackers. However, the British had no intention at that stage of making such an attack.

The British began building two corvettes to match Madison, one each at Kingston and York. Their efforts were hindered, especially at York, by disputes between shipwright Thomas Plucknett, who had been selected by Lieutenant General Sir George Prevost, the Governor General, to superintend the work, and officers such as Captain Andrew Gray, a staff officer in the Army in Upper Canada. Plucknett's work was reckoned to be disorganised, as was that of the shipwright at Kingston, who was dismissed and replaced by the more experienced Daniel Allen. Allen in turn was removed after fomenting disputes over working conditions in March 1813.

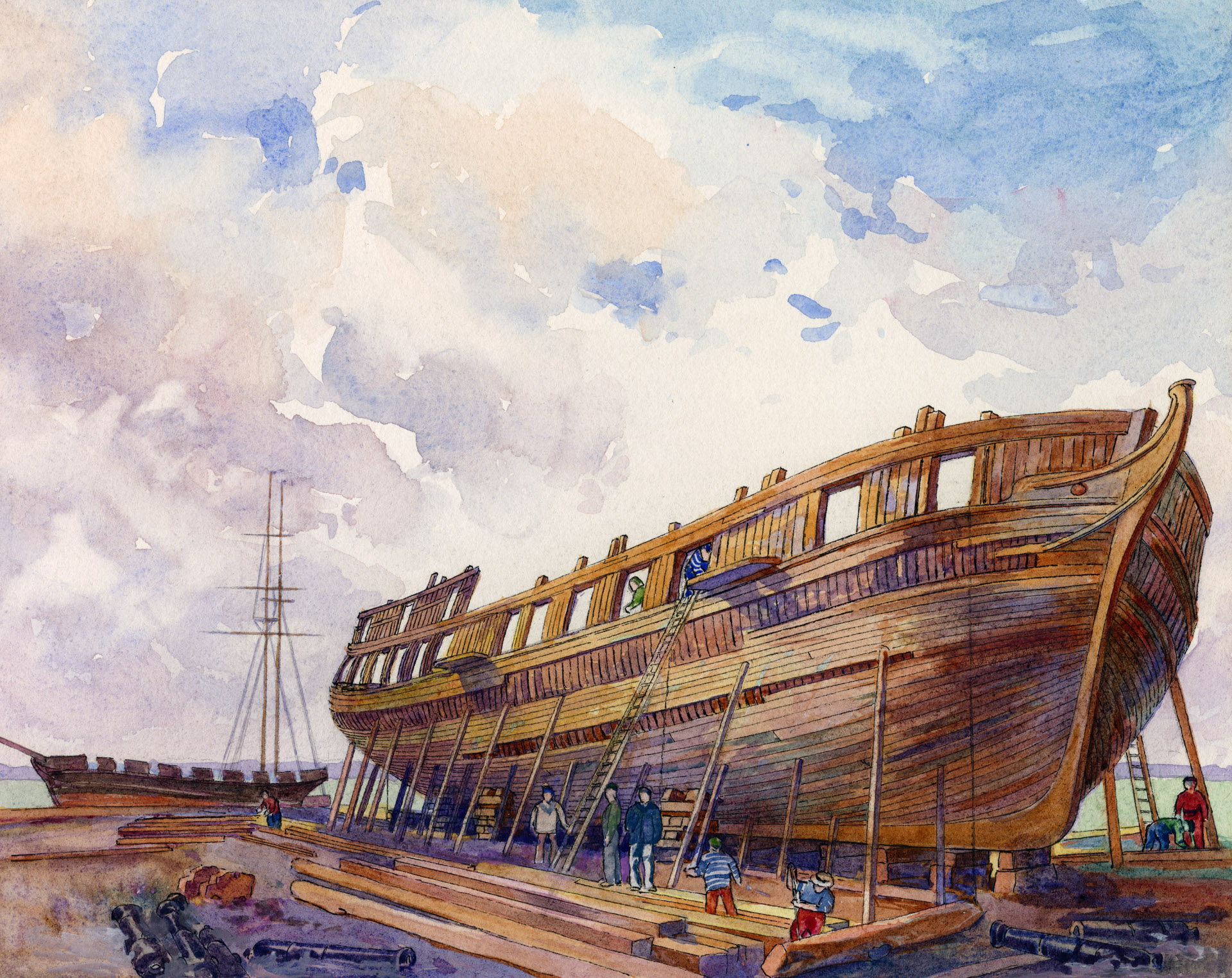
HMS Isaac Brock under construction at York. The British began building two corvettes in an effort to counterbalance the American shipbuilding effort.

Three officers (acting Commanders Robert Heriot Barclay, Robert Finnis and Daniel Pring) had been detached by Vice Admiral Herbert Sawyer from the Royal Navy's North American Station in Halifax, Nova Scotia, to the Provincial Marine, and did much over the winter to refit the existing vessels at Kingston. However, the Admiralty independently appointed Captain James Lucas Yeo to command the naval establishment on the Great Lakes. He collected reinforcements and materials in Britain, and crossed the Atlantic early in 1813.

== Operations in 1813 ==
Chauncey had the advantage in ships and men once the ice melted. He and General Henry Dearborn, the commander-in-chief of the American armies in the north, had the opportunity to strike a blow before British seamen and officers from England could reach Canada and travel up the St. Lawrence River. An attack on Kingston would have been decisive, but Chauncey and Dearborn persuaded themselves that it was defended by 5,000 British regulars (there were in fact only 600). They instead attacked York, the provincial capital. On 27 April at the Battle of York, they defeated the outnumbered defenders under Major General Roger Hale Sheaffe and looted the town. They captured the brig Duke of Gloucester and also several cannon which had been destined for the British squadron on Lake Erie (this capture contributed to the later American victory at the Battle of Lake Erie). The British themselves set fire to the part-completed corvette HMS Sir Isaac Brock to prevent it falling into American hands.

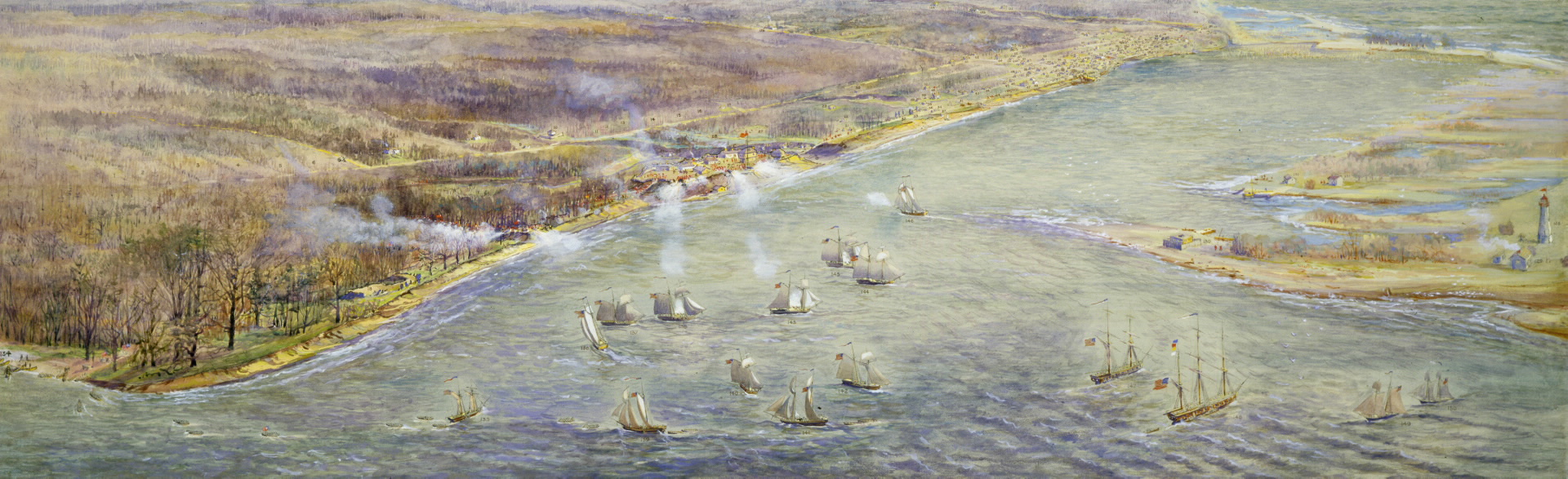
The American naval squadron off the shoreline of York, Upper Canada during the Battle of York, on 27 April. The naval squadron proved effective supporting troops landing by boat.

Chauncey and Dearborn next defeated the British army on the Niagara River at the Battle of Fort George on 27 May. At both York and Fort George, Chauncey's schooners and gunboats (commanded at the latter engagement by Oliver Hazard Perry) had proved very effective in supporting troops landing from boats, by suppressing British batteries and inflicting heavy casualties on British troops who attempted to prevent the Americans landing.

The Americans followed up the retreating British towards Burlington Heights at the western end of the lake, with their lakeside flank covered by Chauncey, but were checked at the Battle of Stoney Creek. The American commanders had left themselves vulnerable to a potentially decisive counter-attack. While they were preoccupied at the western end of Lake Ontario, Commodore Yeo had arrived in Kingston, accompanied by 465 officers and seamen of the Royal Navy, to take charge of the British squadron. Embarking troops under Prevost, who happened to be in Kingston on public and Army business, he almost immediately attacked the American base in the Second Battle of Sacket's Harbor on 29 May. Although this was a strategically bold stroke, both Yeo and Prevost attacked cautiously and called off the attack when they met with stiff resistance. The Americans had prematurely set fire to the captured Duke of Gloucester and a heavy sloop-of-war under construction, General Pike, but managed to put out the fire when the British withdrew. Duke of Gloucester and large quantities of stores were destroyed, but General Pike was saved.

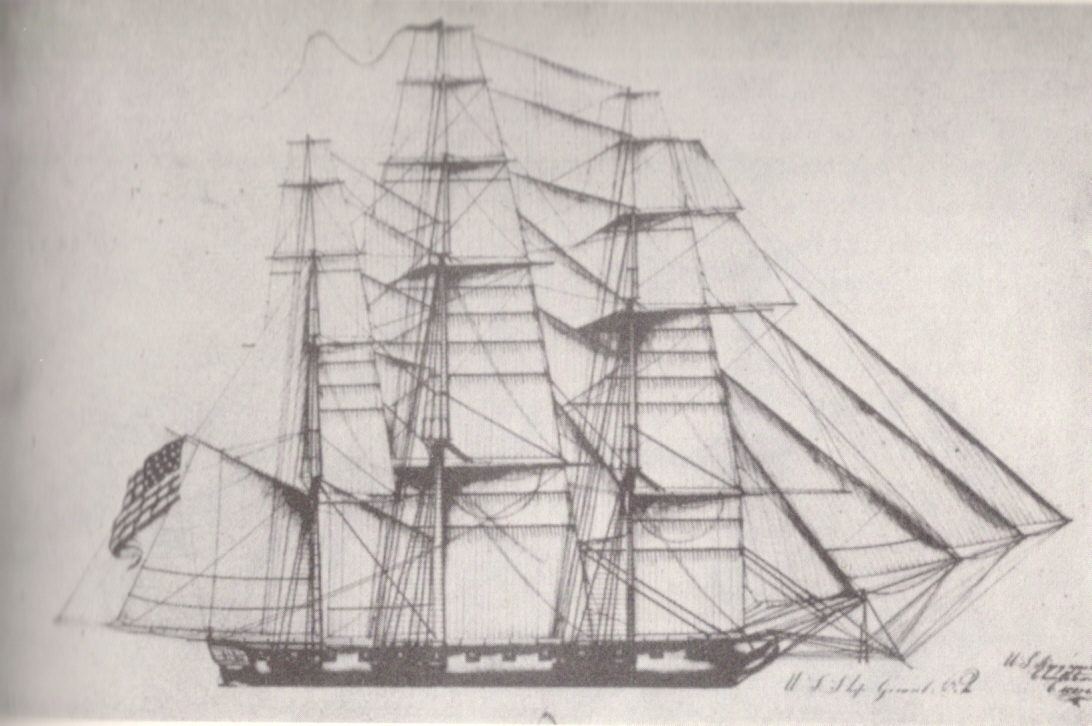
While it was still under construction, USS General Pike was set ablaze in an effort to prevent its capture. The ship was later saved, after the British attack on Sacket's Harbor was repulsed.

Chauncey hastened back to Sacket's Harbor, and remained there awaiting the completion of General Pike. While the Americans declined to contest the lake, Yeo's squadron assisted in driving the American army on the Niagara peninsula back into Fort George. His vessels captured several unguarded batteaux carrying supplies and equipment for the American troops, and raided encampments on their line of communication. On 1 July, Yeo attempted to destroy General Pike while it was fitting out by mounting a raid on Sacket's Harbor in small boats. He was too late to attack at dawn and was forced to wait on the north side of Blackwater Creek. He then called off the attack, fearing correctly that deserters had alerted the Americans.

Chauncey's full squadron put out on 21 July. They first embarked a battalion of 250 infantry under Colonel Winfield Scott and contemplated an assault on the British defensive positions at Burlington Heights. They found that the waters around the British position were too shallow to allow Chauncey's vessels to support any landing, and the defenders were too numerous and well-prepared for Scott to risk an unsupported attack. Instead, they briefly captured York again, this time causing little loss, and even returned some property looted in the earlier attack.

=== Action off the Niagara ===
On 7 August, the Americans encountered Yeo off the mouth of the Niagara River. The two squadrons spent several days in cautious manoeuvres. Chauncey had an advantage in long guns and waited for calm conditions in which he could engage at long range, while Yeo had the advantage in carronades and wanted to close in heavy weather. On the night of 8 August, two American schooners (Hamilton and Scourge) capsized and sank in a sudden squall. Of the 72 men aboard both schooners, 53 were drowned.

On 10 August, the British were to windward. Chauncey formed his squadron into two lines; six schooners were nearest the British, with the heavier ships further away to leeward. As the British edged closer, firing became general. At 11:30 am, Chauncey ordered his windward line to steer downwind and reform to leeward of the heavy vessels. The two leading schooners, Growler and Julia, failed to wear ship and were left cut off from the rest of Chauncey's squadron. Rather than try to beat upwind to rescue the two schooners, Chauncey withdrew downwind, hoping that Yeo would follow him. Instead, Yeo concentrated on the two isolated schooners, both of which were captured.

=== Action off the Genesee ===
Both squadrons withdrew to their bases for provisions before setting out again. On 11 September, there was an indecisive long-range skirmish off the Genesee River about 10 miles (16 km) east of the Niagara. The British squadron was becalmed and for several hours, the American schooners fired at them from long range, while the British attempted to work their vessels out of range by towing them with boats and using sweeps (long oars) through the gunports of the vessels. Towards evening, a land breeze sprang up, which allowed Yeo to pull away and withdraw into Amherst Bay.

=== Action off Burlington ===
On 28 September, the two squadrons met again in York Bay. Chauncey was actually covering a proposed movement of the American army from the Niagara to Sacket's Harbor, while Yeo had just delivered supplies to the British forces on the Niagara peninsula. Both squadrons spotted each other early in the morning. They headed north until Yeo had sent a boat into York with dispatches, then reversed course and headed south in a heavy wind, with Yeo ahead and to leeward. Chauncey had been exasperated by the poor sailing qualities of most of his schooners, and his three fastest vessels (General Pike, the new purpose-built schooner Sylph and Madison) were towing the schooners Asp, Ontario and Fair American.

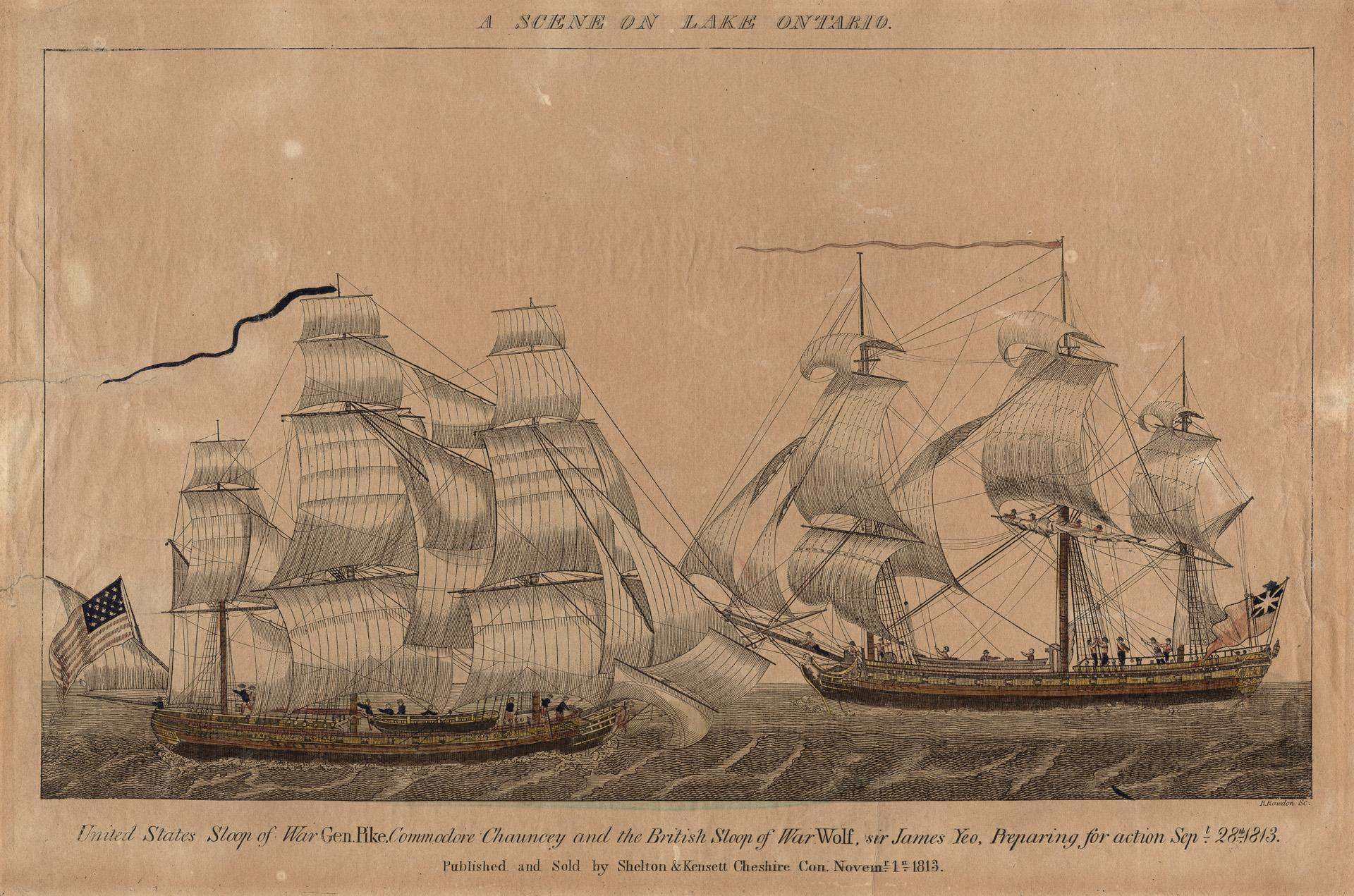
General Pike and HMS Wolfe preparing for action on 28 September.

At about 12:40 pm, Yeo abruptly reversed course, intending to exchange a single broadside with General Pike while they passed on opposite tacks, and then concentrate against the weaker schooners at the rear of Chauncey's line. However, Chauncey also reversed course and General Pike and Yeo's flagship, Wolfe, exchanged several broadsides on the same tack. The American fire brought down Wolfe's mizzen- and main-topmasts. Yeo's second in command, Commander William Mulcaster, interposed his ship, Royal George, between Wolfe and General Pike and backed his sails while the crew of Wolfe cleared away the wreckage and headed downwind towards Burlington Bay at the western end of the lake.

For a while, the two squadrons were mixed up together, and Chauncey's flag captain, Arthur Sinclair, urged Chauncey to capture the two rearmost British vessels (Beresford and Melville) but Chauncey apparently exclaimed "All or none" and chased after Wolfe. He nevertheless refused to cast off the towline to Asp, and no other American vessels were able to get within effective range.

After a chase lasting ninety minutes, Yeo dropped anchor off the north shore of Burlington Bay. The wind had risen to a gale, the American squadron had straggled, and General Pike herself had received damage. (There were several holes beneath the water line forward, and a cannon on the forecastle had exploded, causing several casualties and much destruction. Several other cannon had split and could not be used in case they also burst.) Chauncey called off the action, stating officially that if he had tried to continue the attack, both British and American squadrons might be driven ashore, into British-held territory.

=== Later operations ===
While Yeo made hasty repairs in Burlington Bay, Chauncey effectively controlled the lake. From 29 September, there was a gale which prevented Chauncey watching Yeo. Yeo escaped from Burlington on 2 October. The next day, Chauncey set off in the direction of Yeo's supposed flight. On 5 October, seven vessels were sighted, which turned out to be gunboats and unarmed British schooners transporting troops. One escaped and one was burned. Chauncey captured the other five (which included Growler and Julia), taking 264 prisoners.

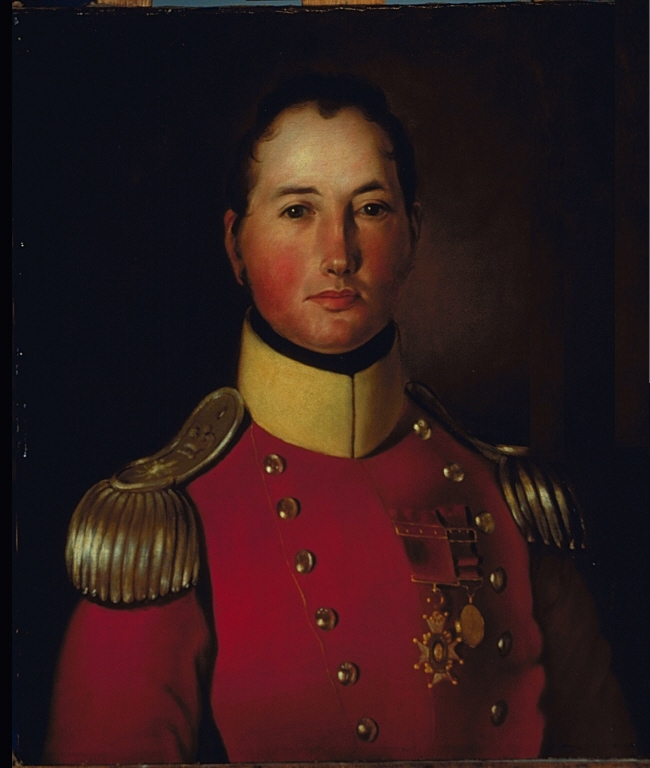
On 11 November, Lieutenant Colonel Joseph Morrison's forces, aided by three gunboats, defeated American forces at the Battle of Crysler's Farm.

The scene of action briefly shifted to the head of the Saint Lawrence River. The American control of the lake had allowed them to complete the movement of their troops from Fort George to Sacket's Harbour in preparation for the planned attack on Montreal late that year. As the army under Major General James Wilkinson moved in many batteaux and other small craft to French Creek near present-day Clayton, New York, some of the British vessels under Commander Mulcaster bombarded their encampments and anchorages until 5 November, when American artillerymen drove them off, setting fire to the brig Earl of Moira with hastily heated red-hot shot. The crew scuttled the brig to extinguish the fire, and later salvaged it.

The American army then began to descend the St. Lawrence. Although Chauncey was supposed to blockade the British in Kingston and prevent them interfering, an effective blockade was difficult in the foul weather of late autumn, and amidst the many islets at the head of the river. This allowed Mulcaster's vessels to return to Kingston to embark a detachment of troops under Lieutenant Colonel Joseph Wanton Morrison and pursue the Americans down the river. On 11 November, Morrison's force, aided by three gunboats under Mulcaster, defeated the Americans at the Battle of Crysler's Farm.

The last event of the year was the transport of William Henry Harrison's troops from the Niagara to Sackett's Harbor, to replace Wilkinson's army. However, this left the Niagara frontier denuded of regular troops, and the British took advantage of this in the Capture of Fort Niagara and the Battles of Lewiston and Buffalo.

=== Vessels on Lake Ontario in 1813 ===
Both sides (especially the British) renamed, re-rigged and re-armed their ships several times during the war. Both sides also possessed several unarmed schooners or other small vessels for use as transports or tenders.

Nationality	Name	Type	Tonnage (bm)	Crew	Armament	Notes
United States Navy	General Pike	sloop-of-war	875	300	28 × long 24-pdr guns	Launched 12 June 1813
United States Navy	Madison	corvette	593	200	28 × 32-pdr carronades	Launched 26 November 1812
United States Navy	Oneida	brig	243	100	16 × 24-pdr guns	Already serving at start of war Notoriously slow-sailing
United States Navy	Sylph	schooner	300	unknown	4 × 32-pdr guns 6 × 6-pdr guns	Launched 18 August 1813
United States Navy	Hamilton	schooner	112	50	1 × 32-pdr gun 1 × 24-pdr gun 8 × 6-pdr guns	Formerly trading vessel Diana; Sunk in squall 8 August 1813
United States Navy	Scourge	schooner	110	50	1 × 32-pdr 8 × 12-pdr carronades	Formerly Canadian trading vessel Lord Nelson; Sunk in squall 8 August 1813
United States Navy	Conquest	schooner	82	40	1 × 32-pdr gun 1 × 12-pdr gun 4 × 6-pdr guns	Formerly trading vessel Genesee Packet
United States Navy	Governor Tompkins	schooner	96	40	1 × 32-pdr gun 1 × 12-pdr gun 4 × 6-pdr guns	Formerly trading vessel Charles and Anne
United States Navy	Julia	schooner	82	35	1 × 32-pdr gun 1 × 12-pdr gun	Captured 10 August 1813; Recaptured 5 October 1813
United States Navy	Growler	schooner	81	35	1 × 32-pdr gun 1 × 12-pdr gun	Captured 10 August 1813; Recaptured 5 October 1813
United States Navy	Ontario	schooner	53	35	1 × 32-pdr gun 1 × 12-pdr gun	
United States Navy	Fair American	schooner	53	30	1 × 24-pdr gun 1 × 12-pdr gun	
United States Navy	Pert	schooner	50	25	1 × 24-pdr gun	Formerly trading vessel Collector
United States Navy	Asp	schooner	57	25	1 × 24-pdr gun	Formerly British trading vessel Elizabeth
United States Navy	Lady of the Lake	schooner	89	15	1 × 9-pdr gun	Launched 1813 as purpose-built despatch vessel
Royal Navy	Wolfe	sloop-of-war	637	220	1 × 24-pdr gun 8 × 18-pdr guns 4 × 68-pdr carronades 10 × 32-pdr carronades	Launched 5 May 1813
Royal Navy	Isaac Brock	sloop-of-war	637	unknown	unknown	Burned on stocks 27 April 1813
Royal Navy	Royal George	sloop-of-war	510	200	3 × 18-pdr guns 2 × 68-pdr carronades 16 × 32-pdr carronades	
Royal Navy	Lord Melville	brig	279	100	2 × 18-pdr guns 12 × 32-pdr carronades	
Royal Navy	Earl of Moira	brig	262	100	2 × 9-pdr guns 12 × 24-pdr carronades	
Royal Navy	Duke of Gloucester	brig	unknown	unknown	"10 guns"	Captured 27 April 1813; Subsequently, burned 29 May 1813
Royal Navy	Beresford	schooner	216	80	2 × 12-pdr guns 10 × 32-pounder carronades	formerly the ship-rigged Prince Regent
Royal Navy	Sir Sydney Smith	schooner	187	70	1 × 12-pdr gun 1 × 9-pdr gun 6 × 18-pdr carronades	formerly named Governor Simcoe transferred from Upper Canada provincial government

== Operations in 1814 ==
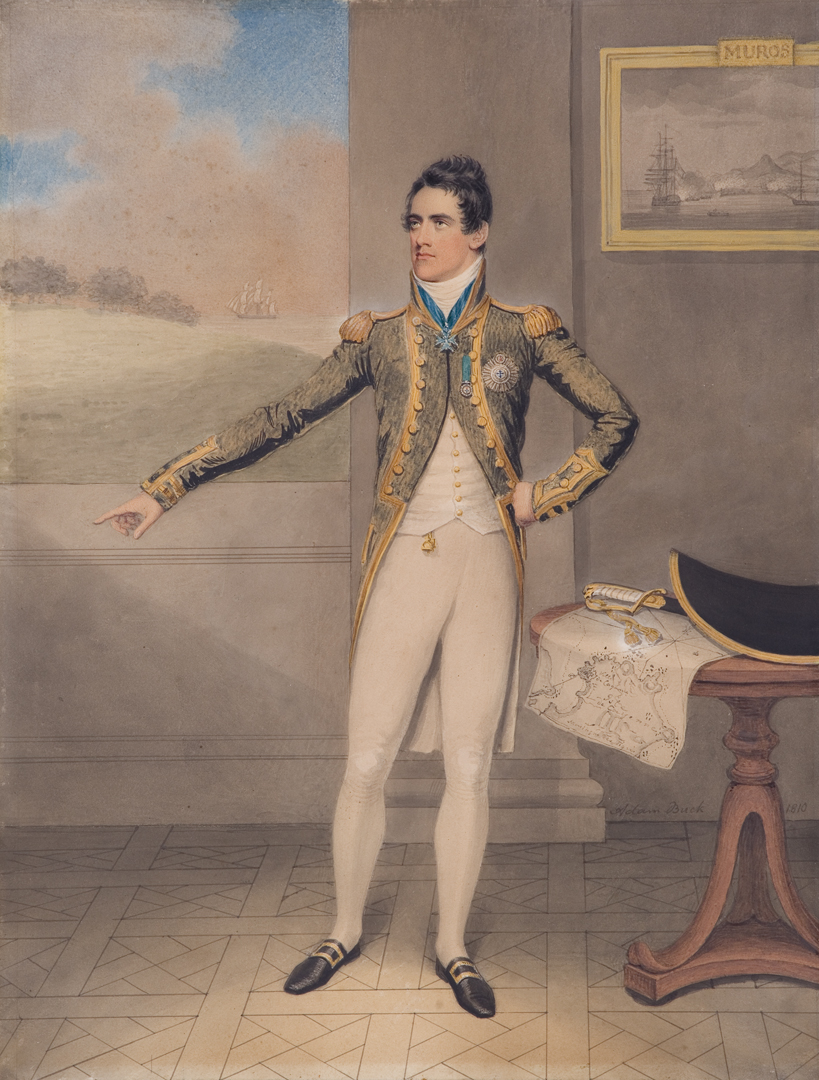
Having been outgunned by the American squadron in 1813, Commodore James Lucas Yeo ordered the construction of several large ships.

=== May to July ===
Over the winter of 1813–14, the Americans diverted shipbuilder Noah Brown and some shipwrights and materials to Lake Champlain, which allowed them to construct the squadron which later won the decisive Battle of Plattsburgh. In Kingston, an officer, Captain Richard O'Conor, who had served alongside Yeo during his earlier career, had been in charge of the dockyards since he arrived in May 1813, and had greatly extended the facilities.

Having been outgunned by Chauncey's vessels in 1813, Yeo had ordered the construction of two big frigates (HMS Prince Regent and HMS Princess Charlotte). When these were ready shortly after the ice broke up, he held the initial advantage. On 6 May, he mounted the Raid on Fort Oswego to interrupt the supply line from the New York Navy Yard to Sacket's Harbor. The raid was partially successful and the British captured several unarmed vessels, including the schooner Growler which changed hands for the third time.

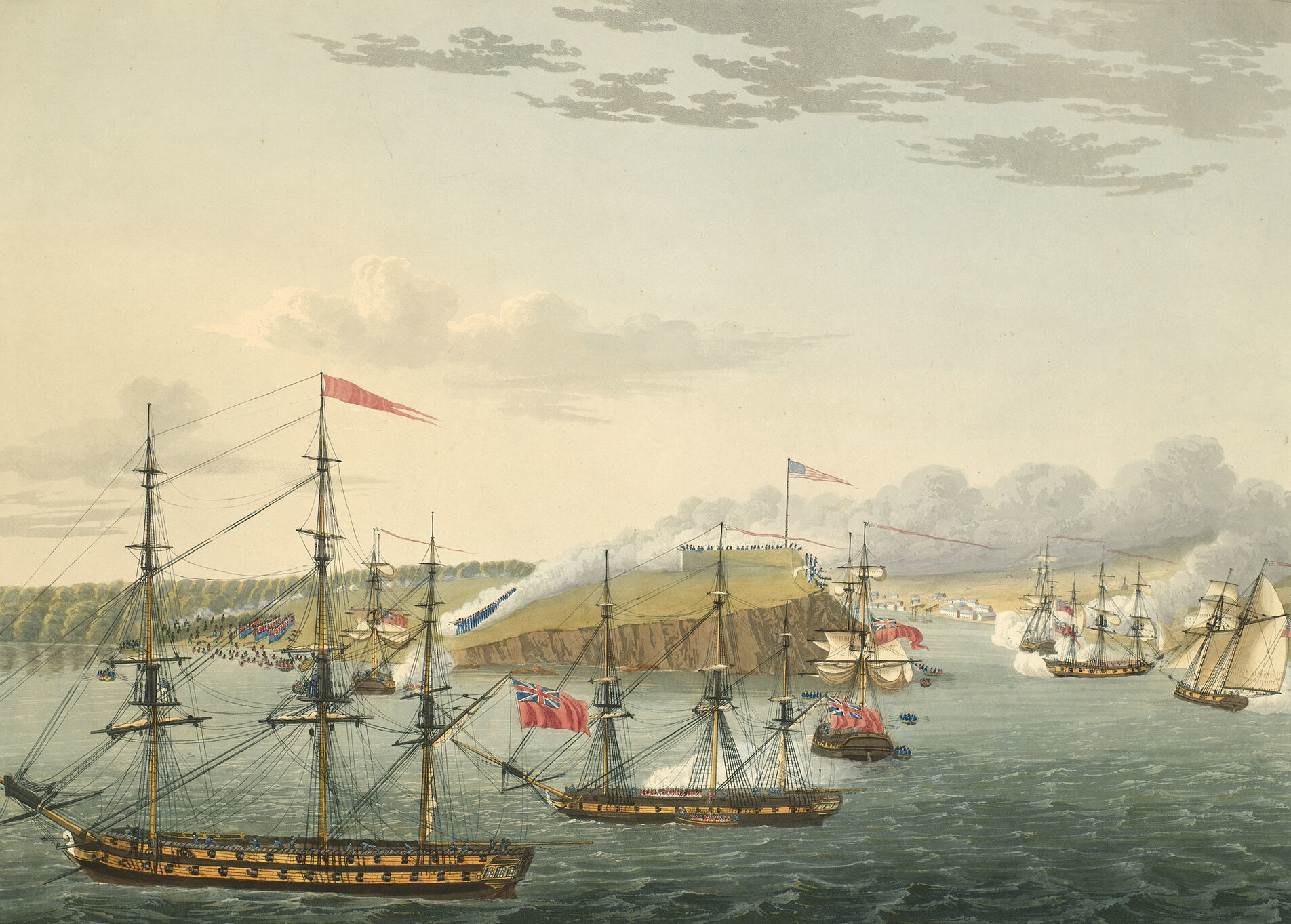
On 6 May, Commodore James Lucas Yeo mounted the Raid on Fort Oswego, disrupting American supply lines to Sacket's Harbor, as well as capturing several unarmed vessels.

Yeo's main aim had been to capture heavy guns intended for Chauncey's own new frigates and heavy brigs, but although seven guns had been captured with Growler, most of the American guns had not yet reached Oswego and were still 12 miles (19 km) up the Oswego River. Yeo and the troops under Lieutenant General Gordon Drummond did not attempt to capture them. Instead, Yeo established a blockade to prevent them reaching Sacket's Harbor. A few weeks later, Lieutenant Woolsey nevertheless tried to take several boats loaded with cannon, cables and other stores for Chauncey's new ships to Sacket's Harbor but was driven into a creek a few miles south of the base. A party of British marines and sailors under Captain Stephen Popham proceeded up the creek to "cut out" the American boats, but on 30 May they were ambushed and all were killed or captured at the Battle of Big Sandy Creek.

The American guns and other stores were carried overland from the battlefield of Big Sandy Creek to Sacket's Harbor (in one instance in an episode known as the "Great Cable Carry"). Once Chauncey had received these guns and other equipment, he was able to complete two frigates (Superior and Mohawk) even larger than Yeo's, and the heavily armed brig sloops Jones and Jefferson. However, his squadron was not ready for service until mid-July, and was then delayed in port until the end of the month, as Chauncey was ill but refused to delegate responsibility to his second in command, Captain Jacob Jones. This seriously hindered the operations of the American army commanded by Major General Jacob Brown, and forced him to abandon a projected attack on Kingston and make an attack across the upper Niagara River instead. When the American squadron eventually did set out onto the lake, Yeo quickly retired into Kingston. The pattern for the year was set; whichever flotilla had a fleeting disadvantage in ships or guns stayed in harbour until they had built something bigger.

=== August to October ===
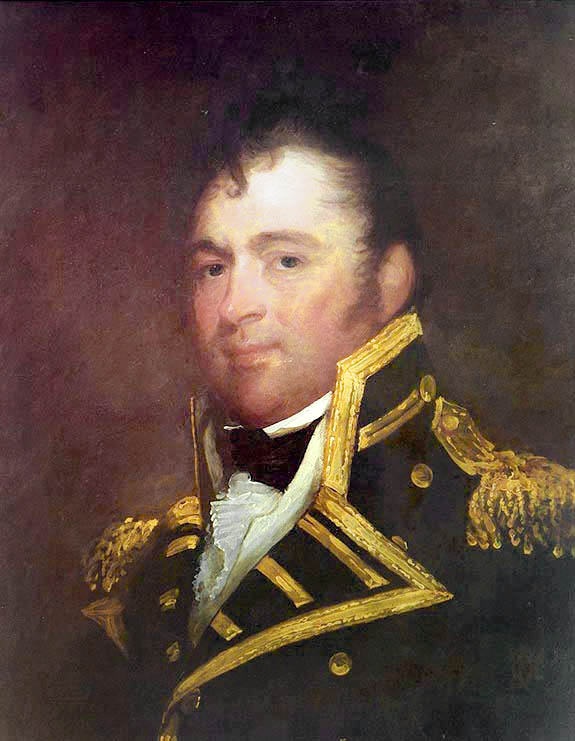
Commodore Chauncey primarily concentrated on "blockading" Kingston from August to September 1814. This decision was criticized by several U.S. Army commanders, including Major General Jacob Brown.

While the Americans controlled the lake, they destroyed a 10-gun brig under construction at Presque Isle on the Saint Lawrence before it could be launched.

On 5 August, three British vessels (Netley, Charwell, and Magnet) sailed from York to the Niagara River with supplies. Magnet had sailed later than the other two, and when Chauncey's squadron appeared suddenly, Magnet was unable to escape. It was run ashore about 6 miles (9.7 km) west of Fort George. After some stores were removed, Magnet was set on fire and blew up before American landing parties could take possession of it. Magnet's commander, Lieutenant George Hawkesworth, was court-martialled in November, and found guilty of causing the loss of his vessel. He was dismissed from the Royal Navy, and later defected to the Americans.

However, Chauncey concentrated on "blockading" Kingston, which Yeo had no intention of leaving while he was inferior in strength, and was criticised by Major General Jacob Brown and other army commanders for his failure to assist the American army on the Niagara peninsula any further, which contributed to the indecisive result of the campaign there. Only three of the smaller American vessels maintained a loose blockade of the Niagara River. The crews of the three small British vessels (Star, Netley and Charwell) blockaded in the river under Commander Alexander Dobbs carried a gig and six batteaux overland, and boarded and captured two American schooners, belonging to the squadron on Lake Erie, in the upper reaches of the river. They subsequently took part in a storming attempt during the Siege of Fort Erie, which failed with heavy casualties.

Eventually, on 21 September, Chauncey's ships transported Major General George Izard's division from Sacket's Harbor to the Genesee River to reinforce the American army on the Niagara. Izard, who was senior to Jacob Brown, refused to make an all-out attack on the outnumbered British army, and eventually retired to the American side of the Niagara.

=== Late October to November ===
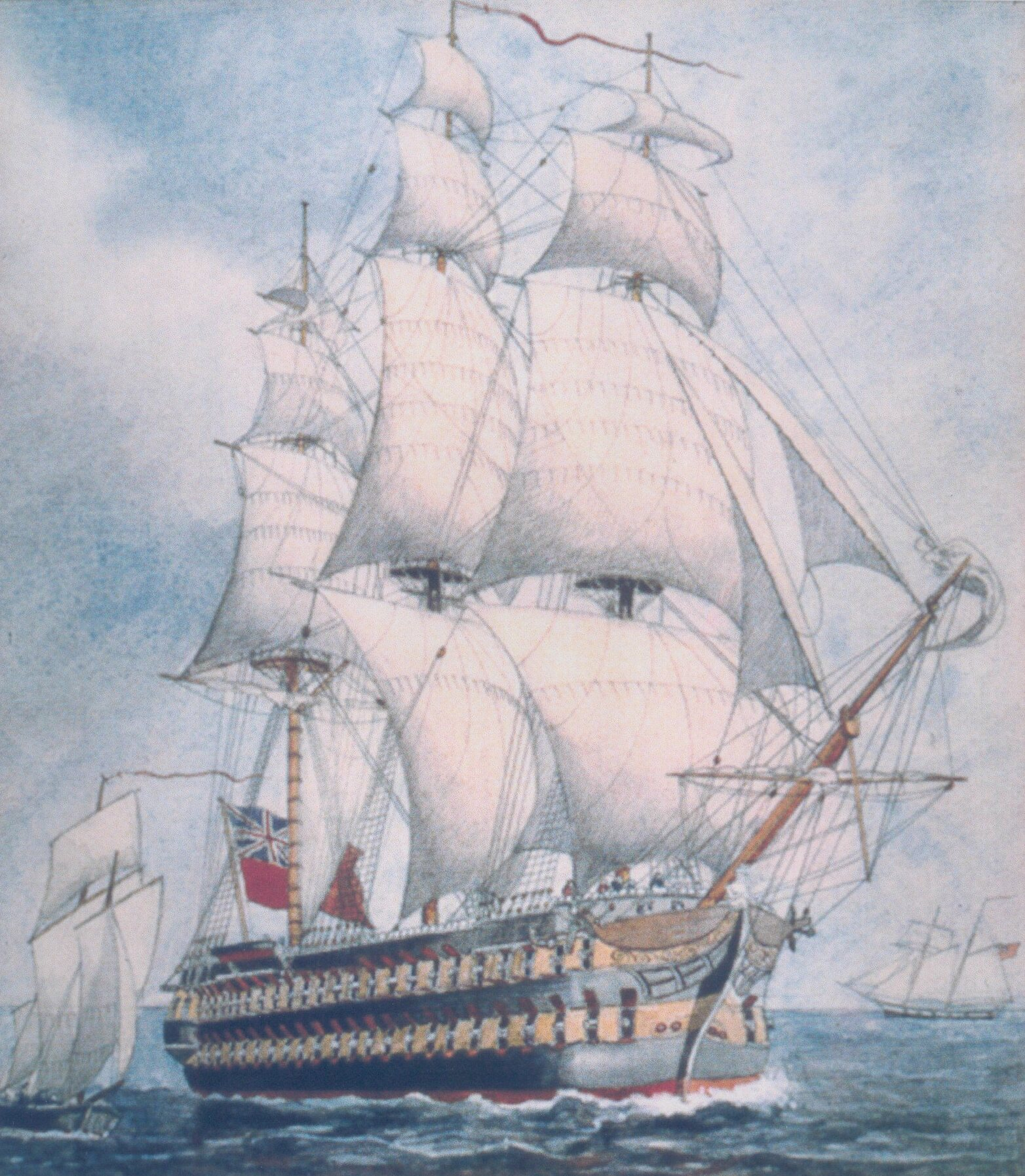
Launched in September, the first-rate ship of the line HMS St Lawrence gave the British uncontested control of the lake during the final months of the war.

On learning that Chauncey was constructing frigates, Yeo had ordered a ship of the line to be laid down. Originally, Yeo had been authorised to construct a third-rate ship of 74 guns, but under Yeo and local shipwright William Bell (who replaced O'Conor, who had been promoted to post captain and appointed to Princess Charlotte), the plans became rather more ambitious. On 15 October, Yeo put out in the three-decked first-rate ship of the line St Lawrence. On 19 October, lightning struck Saint Lawrence and she only narrowly avoided destruction.

Chauncey retired into Sacket's Harbor and Yeo dominated the lake until 21 November, when winter set in. Like Chauncey, Yeo preferred to cruise off the enemy anchorage, neglecting to support Drummond's badly provisioned British army at the western end of the lake until the last few days of navigation before the lake froze.

=== Winter to the end of the war ===
Although the Americans at Sacket's Harbor immediately laid down two ships of the line even larger than St Lawrence, British construction over the winter of 1814–15 matched American attempts to regain the lead. However, Prevost and Yeo were becoming increasingly hostile to each other, following the Battle of Plattsburgh on Lake Champlain. Prevost had recommended that a Rear-Admiral be appointed to Quebec to superintend the Royal Navy's establishment on the Lakes but before this could be considered Prevost himself was relieved, partly because of Yeo's complaints on Prevost's conduct during the Plattsburgh campaign, and also through his conflicts with veteran Army officers of the Peninsular War sent to reinforce the troops in Canada. The Admiralty nevertheless replaced Yeo also, on the grounds of his infrequent returns of accounts and correspondence. His replacement, Captain Edward Owen, did not arrive to take command until after news of the Treaty of Ghent ended hostilities.

=== Vessels on Lake Ontario in 1814 ===
The rival commanders and propagandists often exaggerated or discounted ships' capabilities during the 1814 campaigning season. Most of the American schooners (converted merchant vessels which had been alarmingly unstable with their heavy armament) had been disarmed and were now used as transports only. The British had re-rigged their schooners as brigs and renamed most of their vessels since many of them formerly belonging to the Provincial Marine had names which duplicated those of Royal Navy ships in commission at sea.

Nationality	Name	Type	Tonnage (bm)	Crew	Armament	Notes
United States Navy	Superior	frigate	1,580	500	30 × 32-pdr guns 2 × 24-pdr guns 26 × 42-pdr carronades	4 guns later removed
United States Navy	Mohawk	frigate	1,350	350	26 × 24-pdr guns 2 × 18-pdr guns 14 × 32-pdr carronades	
United States Navy	General Pike	sloop	875	300	26 × 24-pdr guns 2 × 24-pdr chase guns	
United States Navy	Madison	corvette	593	200	2 × 12-pdr guns 22 × 32-pdr carronades	
United States Navy	Jones	brig	500	160	2 × 12-pdr guns 20 × 42-pdr carronades	Over-gunned and unstable
United States Navy	Jefferson	brig	500	160	2 × 12-pdr guns 20 × 42-pdr carronades	Sister ship to Jones
United States Navy	Sylph	brig	300	100	2 ×12-pdr guns 14 × 24-pdr carronades	
United States Navy	Oneida	brig	243	100	2 × 12-pdr guns 14 × 24-pdr carronades	
Royal Navy	St Lawrence	ship of the line	2,305	700	28 × 32-pdr guns 40 × 24-pdr guns 4 × 68-pdr carronades 32 × 32-pdr carronades	
Royal Navy	Prince Regent	frigate	1,450	485	32 × 24-pdr guns 4 × 68-pdr carronades 22 × 32-pdr carronades	
Royal Navy	Princess Charlotte	frigate	1,215	315	26 × 24-pdr guns 2 × 68-pdr carronades 14 × 32-pdr carronades	
Royal Navy	Montreal	sloop	637	220	7 × 24-pdr guns 18 × 18-pdr guns	Formerly Wolfe
Royal Navy	Niagara	sloop	510	200	2 × 12-pdr guns 20 × 32-pdr carronades	Formerly Royal George
Royal Navy	Charwell	brig	279	110	2 × 12-pdr guns 14 × 32-pdr carronades	Formerly Earl of Moira
Royal Navy	Star	brig	262	110	2 × 12-pdr guns 14 × 32-pdr carronades	Formerly Melville
Royal Navy	Netley	brig	216	100	2 × 12-pdr guns 14 × 24-pdr carronades	Formerly Beresford
Royal Navy	Magnet	brig	187	80	2 × 12-pdr guns 12 × 24-pdr carronades	Formerly Sir Sydney Smith; Set on fire to avoid capture 5 August 1814

=== Ships under construction at the end of the war ===
Nationality	Name	Type	Tonnage	Crew	Armament	Notes
United States Navy	New Orleans	ship of the line	2,805	unknown	130 guns (mainly 42-pdr)	Not completed (remains sold 1882)
United States Navy	Chippewa	ship of the line	unknown	unknown	130 guns (mainly 42-pdr)	Not completed
United States Navy	Plattsburgh	frigate	1,748	unknown	"64 guns"	Not completed
Royal Navy	HMS Wolfe (II)	ship of the line	2,152	unknown	36 long 32-pdr 76 long 24-pdr / 24-pdr carronade	Not completed (cancelled 1831); Destroyed on stocks by storm 31 July 1832
Royal Navy	HMS Canada	ship of the line	2,152	unknown	36 long 32-pdr 76 long 24-pdr / 24-pdr carronade	Not completed (cancelled 1832)
Royal Navy	Psyche	frigate	769	315	28 long 24-pdr 28 × 32-pdr carronade	Frame constructed in Britain, 1814; Completed after end of war Originally called "Frigate B"

== Aftermath ==
After the Treaty of Ghent, which ended the war, Britain and the United States in 1817 signed a separate pact, known as the Rush–Bagot Treaty, to limit the number and strength of warships that the parties could maintain on the Lakes. On Lake Ontario, Britain and the United States could keep in commission one vessel each, of no more than 100 tons (bm) and armed with one 18-pounder gun. The parties undertook not to build other armed ships, and to dismantle those already built.

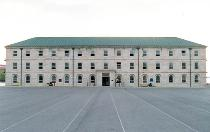
HMCS Stone Frigate was a storehouse in Kingston, built to store gear and rigging for the British fleet from the war. Closed in 1835, is building is presently used by the Royal Military College of Canada.

In fact, very few of the existing ships were broken up. The British constructed a storehouse, referred to as a "stone frigate", to keep the rigging and other fittings. The building survives today as dormitory to Hudson Squadron at the Royal Military College of Canada and is still referred to by the same name. In theory, the British could have recommissioned their entire squadron within a few days. By 1827 however, all the ships were mouldering, and unfit for service. The stores were auctioned in 1834 and the surviving ships were written off or disposed of over the next few years. Several were sunk in Navy Bay near Kingston.

The American squadron also quickly fell into disrepair. It had been acknowledged when the vessels were built that they would last only five or six years, with their green wood and rough finish. One survivor was the unfinished ship of the line New Orleans, which was enclosed by a great shed on the slipway. The shed collapsed in 1881 and the remains of the ship were sold in 1883.

== Results ==
Because neither side had been prepared to risk everything in a decisive attack on the enemy fleet or naval base, the result of all the construction effort on Lake Ontario was an expensive draw. The great demands for men and materials made by both squadrons adversely affected other parts of the war effort.

The Americans had been based at Sacket's Harbor, and this small town was unable to cope with the great numbers of soldiers, sailors and shipwrights there. There were many deaths from cold, exposure and inadequate rations during the winter months, and from disease during the summer. (Blackwater Creek, on which the town lay, had no fresh water flowing into it, and quickly became a stagnant sewer.) On the British side, the effort required to ship all the ordnance and naval stores up the Saint Lawrence prevented them from deploying sufficiently large numbers of troops in Upper Canada. Prevost once reported paying £1,000 to transport one monstrous cable for the ship of the line Saint Lawrence to Kingston, and complained that the demands of Yeo's squadron pre-empted the entire transport service up the Saint Lawrence during the later months of 1814.

Historians have criticised both Yeo and Chauncey for their unwillingness to act decisively, and for the long and rambling excuses for their setbacks that they made in their despatches. Chauncey has received more abuse from American historians than Yeo has from British historians. Roosevelt (and subsequent authors) argued that, as the overall American strategy was offensive, the American forces on Lake Ontario ought to have risked an attack against Kingston, or Chauncey should have sought an all-out action against Yeo's squadron when opportunity offered. Instead, Chauncey (and the Army commanders Dearborn and Wilkinson) repeatedly shied away from any attack on Kingston, while Chauncey failed to pursue Yeo to destruction after the action in York Bay on 28 September 1813. After the British attack on Sackett's Harbor, Chauncey continually hampered operations against targets other than Yeo's ships. He either kept his vessels in port waiting for more ships, or refused to use them to support the Army's attacks elsewhere (on the Niagara peninsula, for example).

By contrast, it has been argued that since the British strategy under Governor General Prevost was defensive for most of the war, Yeo needed only to avoid defeat, and certainly succeeded in this. However, British (and Canadian) historians such as Forester and J. Mackay Hitsman have argued that he did so at such cost that other operations were curtailed or thwarted. For example, Yeo's hoarding of men and supplies, and failure to forward sufficient of these to the British squadron on Lake Erie, contributed to their complete defeat. Similarly, a far smaller effort on Lake Champlain than that required to construct ships of the line on Lake Ontario would have made British victory on Champlain certain.
