= HMS Lord Melville =

Brig of the Royal Navy

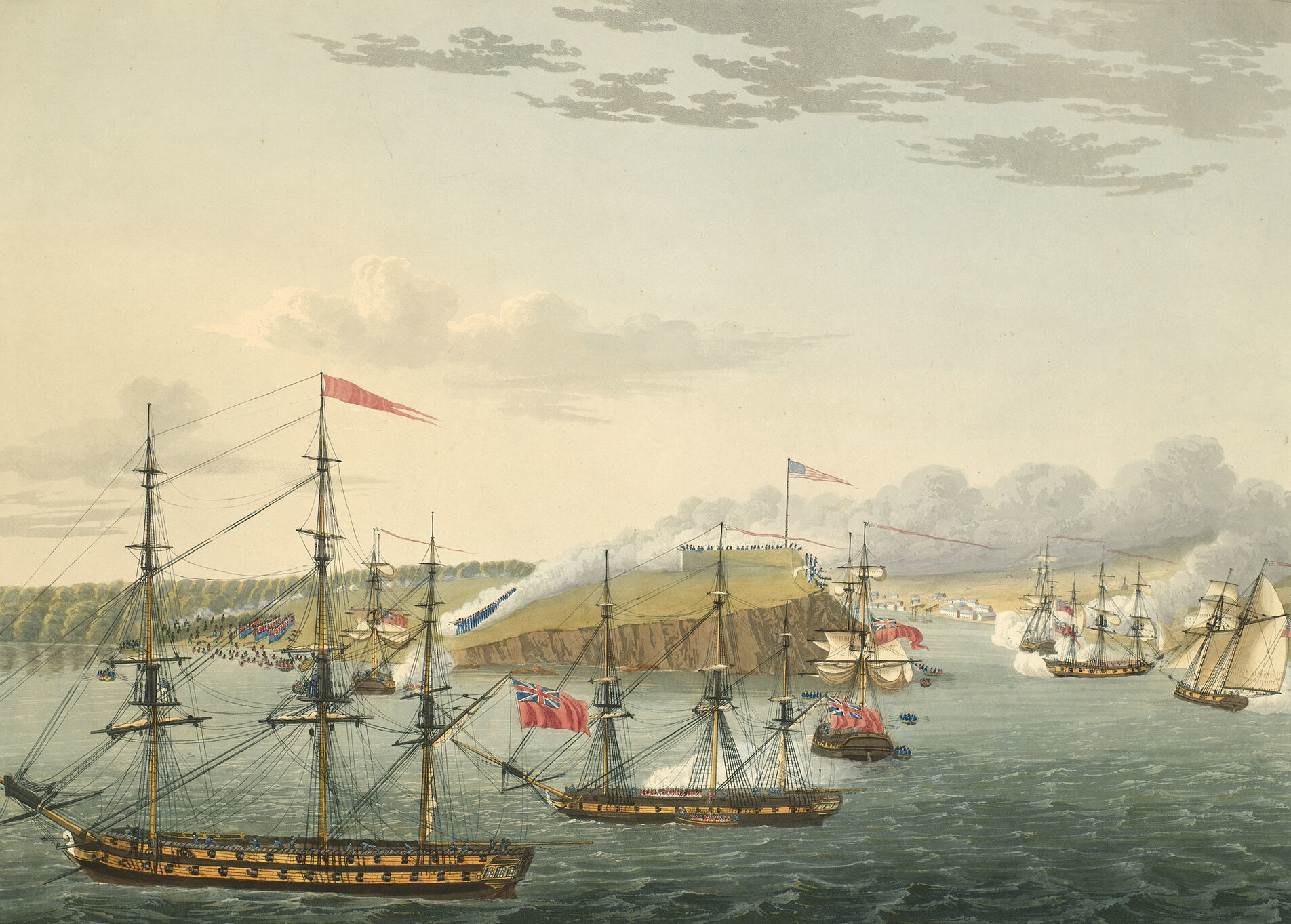
- Attack on Fort Oswego, Lake Ontario. Star can be seen astern centre right

History

United Kingdom
- Name: Lord Melville
- Builder: Kingston Royal Naval Dockyard, Kingston
- Launched: 1813
- Renamed: Star on 22 January 1814
- Honours and awards: War of 1812
- Fate: Sold in 1837

General characteristics
- Type: Schooner, altered to 14-gun brig in 1813
- Tons burthen: 186 46/94 bm
- Length: 71 ft 7 in (21.8 m) (gun deck); 56 ft 9 1/2 in (17.3 m) (keel)
- Beam: 24 ft 8 in (7.5 m)
- Draught: 9 ft 9 in (3.0 m)
- Depth of hold: 8 ft 0 in (2.4 m)
- Complement: 98
- Armament: 2 × 18 pdr (8 kg) long guns; 12 × 32 pdr (15 kg) carronades

HMS Lord Melville (also known as HMS Melville) was a brig of the Royal Navy launched at Kingston, Ontario, on 20 July 1813. Initially designed as a schooner, she was altered to 14-gun brig in 1813. She served on Lake Ontario during the War of 1812, and was renamed HMS Star on 22 January 1814. By 1815, she was unfit for anything but transport duties. She was sold in 1837.

== Description ==
Lord Melville was initially ordered as a schooner to a design by Master Shipwright George Record of the Kingston Royal Naval Dockyard and was enlarged to a brig after construction began. The vessel measured 186 46/94 tons burthen and was 71 ft 7 in (21.8 m) long at the gun deck and 56 ft 9 1/2 in (17.3 m) at the keel. The vessel had a beam of 24 ft 8 in (7.5 m) and a draught of 9 ft 9 in (3.0 m). The brig's hold had a depth of 8 ft 0 in (2.4 m). Lord Melville had an initial complement of 98 composed of 60 officers and crew and 38 Royal Marines. By 1830, this number had dropped to 80. The vessel was initially armed with sixteen 32-pounder (15 kg) carronades, later reduced to twelve 32-pounder carronades and adding two 18-pounder (8 kg) long guns. In 1815, the armament consisted of four 18-pounder guns, two 9-pounder (4 kg) guns and eight 24-pounder (11 kg) carronades. By 1830, all fourteen guns were 32-pounder carronades.

== Service history ==
=== As Lord Melville ===
During a survey of the shipyard at Kingston, Upper Canada, it was found that there was enough building material contained within the yard to construct a new vessel. A schooner was ordered for the Lake Ontario squadron in March 1813. Lord Melville was launched at Kingston on 22 July 1813. The brig departed Kingston with Commodore Sir James Lucas Yeo's squadron on 31 July for Lake Ontario with the intent of engaging their American counterparts under Commodore Isaac Chauncey. Lord Melville took part in a series of engagements off the Niagara River and Burlington Bay, including the capture of the American schooners Julia and Growler on 10 August. The following day, Lord Melville sprang a leak and the squadron returned Kingston, where the brig underwent repairs.

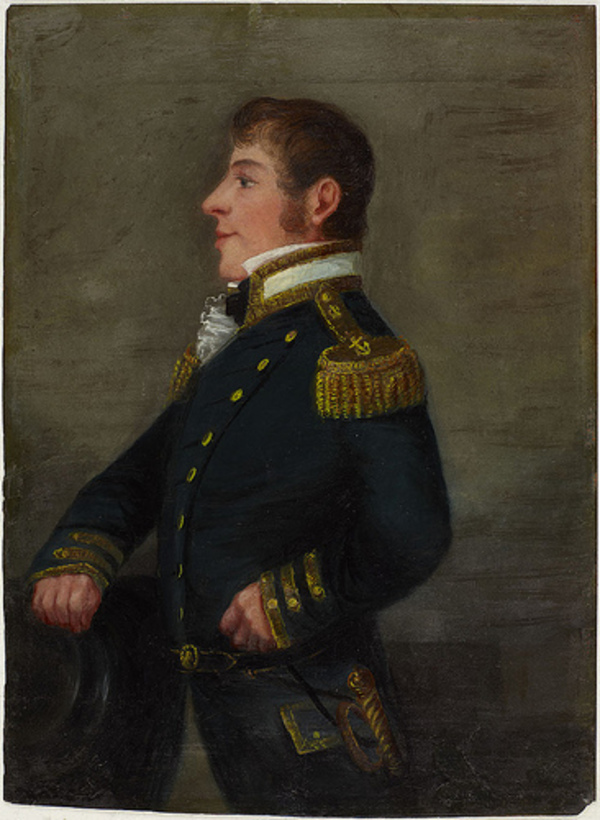
Francis Brockell Spilsbury II, commander during the Genesee River engagement, had to make repairs during the battle. Also present at the actions off Burlington Bay (Hamilton Harbour) on 28 September and French Creek, New York, on 1 November 1813.

Yeo's squadron returned to Lake Ontario on 24 August and sailed for Niagara. On 11 September, the British squadron became becalmed off the Genesee River, where it was set upon by the American squadron. Lord Melville and Royal George were the vessels closest to the American squadron and bore the brunt of the cannon fire. Between the two vessels, they suffered four men killed and five wounded, but the British squadron escaped. In a following engagement on 28 September, after the flagship of the British squadron, Wolfe was dismasted, Lord Melville and Earl of Moira attacked the American battle line, exchanging heavy fire with Madison, Oneida and Governor Tompkins. Lord Melville was nearly captured by the American flagship General Pike. The British retreated into Burlington Bay. Lord Melville and Beresford patrolled while Wolfe and Royal George made repairs. The squadron returned to Kingston after the two larger vessels were capable of sailing.

As part of the British attempt to intercept the American army marching on Montreal in October, the smaller vessels in the squadron were detached under Captain William Mulcaster and sailed to French Creek. There, four vessels, including Lord Melville bombarded the Americans. The British were forced to withdraw after the American gunnery from the shore became too intense. Mulcaster's force suffered one killed and five injured. In November, the squadron remained mostly at anchor due to the weather and Lord Melville made one final trip on 3 December before being laid up for the winter.

=== As Star ===
The brig was renamed Star on 22 January 1814, reclassified as a brig-sloop and command was given to Commander Charles Cunliffe Owen. In May 1814, Lieutenant Charles Anthony took command of Star. On 4 May, the British squadron sailed from Kingston with infantry and Royal Marines embarked. Yeo's squadron arrived off Fort Oswego on 5 May. The following day at 06:00, the attack on Fort Oswego began. At 12:00, Star and Charwell (the renamed Earl of Moira) escorted the gunboats and bateaux loaded with infantry towards the shore. The British attack was successful and the fort was captured. The town was looted of goods and the squadron returned to Kingston on 8 May.

The squadron sailed again on 11 May and began a naval blockade of the main American naval base on Lake Ontario, Sackett's Harbor on 19 May. Star was used to transport troops to the Burlington and Niagara regions while the larger vessels of the squadron maintained the blockade. Following the British defeat at Sandy Creek where a detachment from the squadron had been captured or killed, Yeo lifted the blockade on 5 June and the British squadron returned to Kingston.

Two captains of the squadron had been captured at Sandy Creek, which led to a shuffle in commands. Commander Alexander Dobbs became the commanding officer of Star. In July Dobbs took command of a detachment from the squadron composed of Star, Charwell, Magnet and the British Army tender Vincent that sailed to the Niagara River to provide quick transportation for the forces under General Gordon Drummond's forces moving from York, Upper Canada into the Niagara region. Following the loss of Magnet, which had been blown up to avoid capture, Dobbs' detachment remained penned up in the Niagara River by elements of the American squadron. Dobbs led a party of his men from his vessels to Fort Erie where they operated under Drummond's command. Dobbs and his men captured two American schooners, Ohio and Somers, on 12 August that had been left behind to aid the American army. However, the commander of Netley (the renamed Beresford) was killed in the action. The two prizes were taken down the Niagara River to Chippawa. On 15 August, Dobbs and his men were among the attackers during an assault on Fort Erie. Over 48 men in the party were injured, killed or missing with Dobbs among the wounded.

On 20 October, the larger ships of Yeo's squadron arrived off the Niagara River, forcing the Americans to withdraw. Star, Charwell and Netley came out to Yeo's vessel and disembarked the infantry reinforcements and supplies they carried for Drummond's army. This took until 22 October and the entire squadron returned to Kingston on 24 October. On 1 November, the squadron sailed again to Niagara, ferrying infantry to Fort George and returned with troops bound for Kingston. On 28 November, Montreal (the renamed Wolfe), Niagara (the renamed Royal George), Charwell, Star and Netley sailed from Kingston to resupply the army in the Niagara region. They returned on 9 December.

Star was fit for nothing but transport duties by 1815. In 1815, the vessel was placed under the command of Acting Lieutenant Massy Herbert. Star was paid off into reserve in June 1816. She was sold in 1837.
