= Battle of Big Sandy Creek =

1814 battle of the War of 1812

Coordinates: 43°42.614′N 76°10.945′W

- Part of the War of 1812
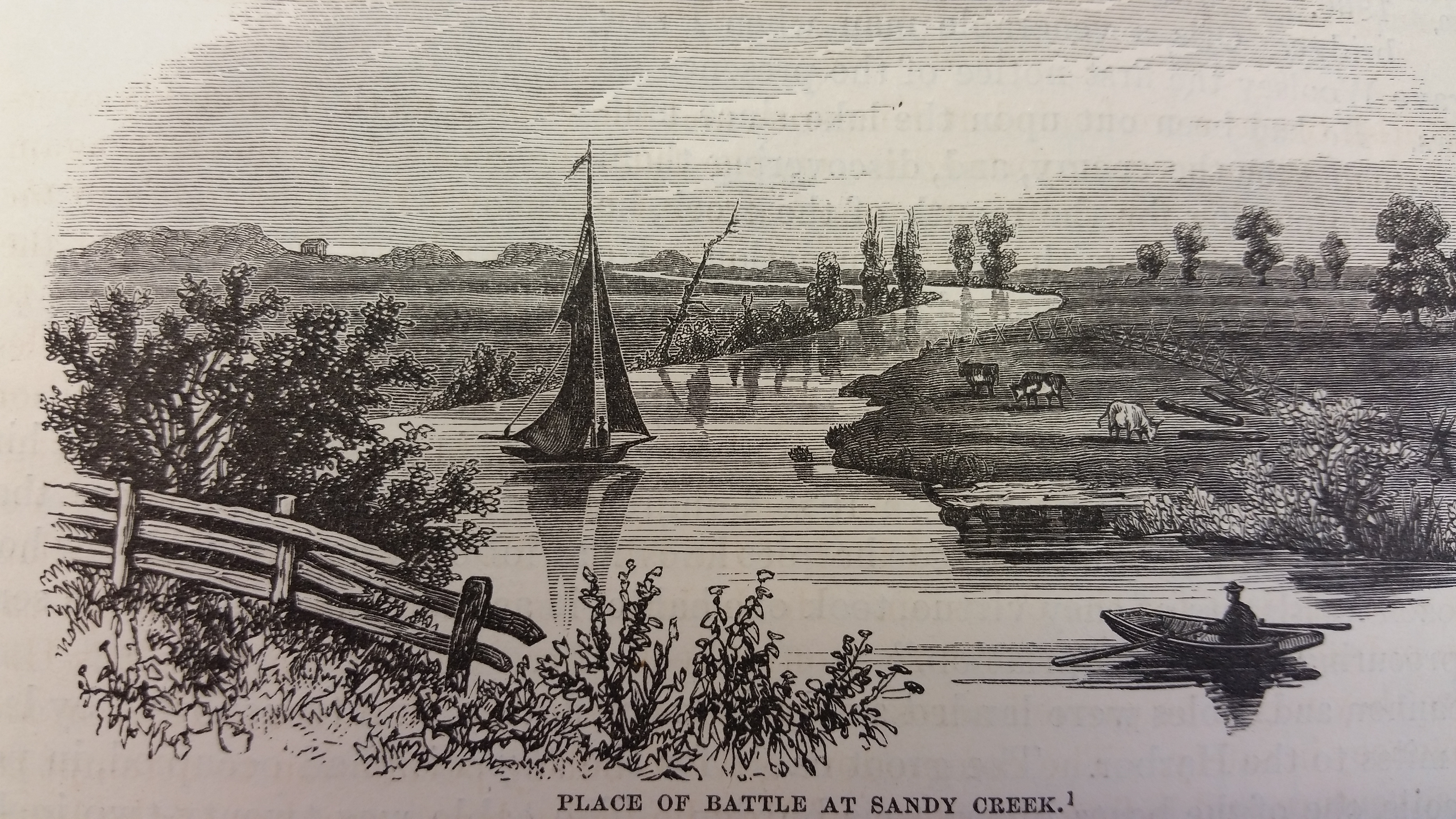
- Battle of Big Sandy Creek
Date	May 29–30, 1814
Location	Ellisburg, New York
Result	American-Oneida victory

Belligerents
United Kingdom	United States; Oneida Indians

Commanders and leaders
(United Kingdom of Great Britain and Ireland) Stephen Popham (surrendered) (United Kingdom of Great Britain and Ireland) Francis Brockell Spilsbury (surrendered)	(United States) Melancthon T. Woosley (United States) Daniel Appling

Strength
185–187	150 riflemen 120-130 Oneida Indians

Casualties and losses
13–14 killed 30 wounded 142–143 captured 3 gunboats captured 2 cutters captured 1 gig captured	2 wounded

The Battle of Big Sandy Creek was fought in northwestern New York on May 29–30, 1814, during the War of 1812. American troops and Oneida Indians launched an attempted surprise attack on British troops and sailors, who were pursuing them inland from Lake Ontario.

With the loss of a boat, and its subsequent discovery by British forces, the Americans lost the element of surprise prior to the battle. Nevertheless, the strategy was still implemented successfully, forcing the entire British force to surrender and ending their advance.

== Background ==
After the successful attack on Fort Oswego on May 5–6, 1814, the British withdrew to the Galloo Islands in northern Lake Ontario where they could monitor and intercept any supplies on their way north to Sackets Harbor, New York. At the American ship yards in Sackets Harbor, two brigs, USS Jefferson and Jones, and a frigate, Superior, waited for armament and rigging necessary for their launch. The supplies needed to outfit the ships had been transported from the Brooklyn Naval Yards on Long Island to Albany, New York, and from Albany up the Mohawk River to Wood Creek and Oneida Lake, finally arriving at the Oswego River. These supplies still needed to be transported from Oswego to Sackett's Harbor, but it needed to be done without alerting the British.

On April 21, 1814, Commodore Isaac Chauncey sent orders from Sackets Harbor to Lieutenant Melancthon Taylor Woolsey directing him to choose five officers and twenty-five men to proceed in USS Lady of the Lake to Oswego and then bring the shipbuilding supplies north to the shipyards.

== Battle ==
On the rainy evening of May 28, Woolsey set out with 150 riflemen under the command of Major Daniel Appling in 19 boats loaded with supplies. On the morning of May 29, they arrived at the mouth of the Big Salmon River having mysteriously lost one of their boats. This boat, discovered by the British forces, eliminated the secrecy of Wooley's mission.

At Big Salmon, the American forces met up with the Oneidas (estimates range from 120 to 130 Indians), who Woolsey had dispatched the previous day. The Oneidas marched north along the shore as the boats proceeded in the lake. At noon on May 29, they reached the mouth of the Big Sandy Creek. All the boats were sent as far inland as possible.

Woolsey then sent a lookout to scout for British ships. The lookout discovered that a gunboat and three barges were headed for the location of the American forces. Woolsey set out a call for the neighboring militia and hastily prepared for battle.

At 8 a.m., the British began to cannonade the American forces from the mouth of the Big Sandy Creek. The American forces hid along the shoreline of the creek and waited for the British to advance inland. At about 10 a.m., when the British forces had progressed up the creek, the American forces rose from their concealment, and a brief ten-minute battle ensued. The British officers quickly surrendered to avoid further casualties.

== Losses ==
The Americans suffered two wounded: an Oneida Indian and a U.S. rifleman. Appling wrote to Brigadier General Edmund P. Gaines on May 30, listing the British casualties as 14 killed, including a British midshipman; 2 lieutenants of the Royal Marines and 28 sailors and marines wounded and captured; 6 officers and 133 others taken prisoner. According to a British source, 19 of their forces were killed. Also captured were three gunboats (one with a 24-pounder (11 kg) and a 63-pounder (29 kg) gun), two cutters and one gig.

== Aftermath ==
The Americans won the battle but the British Navy still maintained a presence on Lake Ontario. Overland was the only way for the Americans to get their supplies the rest of the way to Sackets Harbor. Ox carts carried most of the supplies except for the 9,600-pound (4,400 kg) anchor cable for the USS Superior. Two hundred volunteers carried the cable on their shoulders the remaining 20 miles. 100 men at a time shouldered roughly 100 pounds each for three days successfully avoiding the British.
