= USS Asp (1812) =

Early-19th-century American naval sailboat

History

United States
- Name: USS Asp
- Acquired: by capture, 1812
- Commissioned: 6 February 1813
- Fate: Sold, 15 May 1815

General characteristics
- Type: Schooner
- Tonnage: 57 long tons (58 t)
- Complement: 45 officers and enlisted
- Armament: 1 × 32-pounder gun; 2 × 6-pounder guns

The first Asp was a schooner in the United States Navy during the War of 1812.

Asp, the former British merchant vessel Elizabeth, was captured on Lake Ontario in 1812 by the schooner Growler, purchased by the Navy from the prize court: outfitted; and commissioned on 6 February 1813.

== Service history ==
=== Battle of York ===
Asp got underway on 25 April 1813 as a unit of Commodore Isaac Chauncey's Lake Ontario squadron escorting General Henry Dearborn's 1,700 troops to York (now Toronto), Canada. The squadron arrived off York two days later. While Dearborn's troops hustled ashore, Asp and the other ships of the squadron supported them by bombarding the town's defenses. Outnumbered and outgunned, the defenders gave way after a brief, but stubborn, defense. The squadron remained at York for about a week loading booty of war and destroying that which could not be carried on. At York, the American force captured the 10-gun brig Gloucester and destroyed an 'almost complete' 24-gun ship. When the warships left York, they spent the following two weeks convoying reinforcements and supplies to General Dearborn.

=== Battle of Fort George ===
The next enterprise decided upon was an attack on Fort George, located almost due south from York across the western end of Lake Ontario and on the Canadian side of the Niagara River where it empties into Lake Ontario. Commodore Chauncy carefully reconnoitered the defenses of the British stronghold on 26 May. Before dawn the following morning, the squadron moved in with the embarked assault troops. While the larger ships of the squadron bombarded the various defenses and batteries around the fort, Asp joined Hamilton and Scourge in covering the landings themselves. Their point-blank grape shot fire riddled the British ranks to such a degree that the American troops easily established a beachhead and soon drove off the remnants of the British who tried unsuccessfully to rally further inland. In that victorious combined operation, the American Army and Navy succeeded in securing the Niagara frontier and the river by forcing the British to evacuate the entire area. It also allowed the Lake Erie squadron to be augmented by five vessels which had been bottled up in the Niagara between the falls and British batteries at the southern (Lake Erie) end of the river.

=== At Sackett's Harbor ===
While the American squadron had been concentrating on the western end of Lake Ontario, the British had been augmenting their squadron at Kingston in the eastern portion. Late in May, they made an unsuccessful attempt to carry Sackett's Harbor by storm. Chauncy took his squadron – Asp included – back to the eastern part of the lake and, on 2 June, put into Sackett's Harbor where he was forced to remain due to the temporary inferiority of his force to that of the British. The enemy then ranged the lake at will capturing stockpiles and intercepting American supplies.

=== Raid on York ===
However, on 21 July, the American squadron weighed anchor and set a course for the western end of the lake. The warships arrived at Niagara on the 27th and loaded a force of American troops to repeat the attack on York carried out the previous summer. On 30 July, the squadron conducted another successful raid on York, destroying 11 British transports and carrying off 5 cannon, some ammunition, and some flour. The ships returned to Niagara and disembarked the troops on 3 August.

=== Action off the Niagara ===
While Asp and the rest of the American squadron were still at Niagara, the British squadron appeared off the anchorage on the 7th. For three days, the two squadrons went through a tedious series of maneuvers ostensibly to bring about an action. A somewhat desultory action took place on the evening of the 10th. It consisted of some long-range gunfire in which Asp participated. The main result of that skirmish was the loss of two American schooners, Growler and Julia, which ships turned in the wrong direction and were cut off by the British. After another day or so of ineffectual maneuvering, the American squadron headed for Sackett's Harbor, where it arrived on the 13th. After taking on five weeks worth of provisions, the warships departed the harbor that same evening. The two squadrons spent the next month sailing up and down the lake, each trying to maneuver the other into a position of decisive advantage to itself.

=== Action off the Genesee ===
Near the mouth of the Genesee River on 11 September, the American warships exchanged gunfire with their British counterparts from extreme range. Though the British received the worst of it due to the American superiority in long guns, damage to both sides proved almost inconsequential; and the British escaped into Amherst Bay.

=== Action off Burlington ===
After a 17-day hiatus, the two forces met again on 28 September at York Bay. When the British ships were sighted, Asp was in tow of the American lead ship, General Pike, with Tompkins following close behind. The other American ships followed some distance astern. Fearing the loss of their sternmost ships, the British came around. The three leading American ships bore down upon them. The British van, composed of their two largest ships, the flagship Wolfe and Royal George, opened with their starboard batteries. The Americans responded, and Pike quickly shot away Wolfe's main topmast and main yard. Thereupon, the British flagship crowded sail on her foremast and moved off in headlong flight covered by Royal George. All other British ships, with the exception of Royal George, followed the example of the flagship. Pike tried to pursue but did not cast off Asp and, therefore, made no gain on the fleeing enemy who made good his escape. For the remainder of the 1813 navigation season, the American squadron kept the British blockaded in Kingston.

=== Later operations ===
With the British cleared from Lake Ontario, Asp and the other schooners became transports for troops and stores. On one occasion, 17 November 1813, she assisted in transporting 1,100 of General William Henry Harrison's troops from the mouth of the Genesee River to Sackett's Harbor. Asp never again saw combat and, apparently, served through the remainder of the war as a transport. She was sold at Sackett's Harbor on 15 May 1815.
