= USS Lady of the Lake =

Coordinates: 42°47′20″N 77°43′9″W

History

United States
- Name: USS Lady of the Lake
- Builder: Henry Eckford
- Laid down: 1812
- Launched: 6 April 1813
- Commissioned: 19 April 1813
- Fate: Sold, 2 February 1826

General characteristics
- Type: Schooner
- Displacement: 89 long tons (90 t)
- Propulsion: Sail
- Complement: 40 officers and enlisted
- Armament: • 1 × 9-pounder gun

USS Lady of the Lake was a small schooner in the United States Navy during the War of 1812. She was built by Henry Eckford of Sacketts Harbor, New York, during the summer and winter of 1812–13, launched 6 April 1813 and entered service 13 days later, Sailing Master Flinn in command.

== History ==
Built under the personal supervision of Commodore Isaac Chauncey for duty as a dispatch boat on Lake Ontario carrying messages to Niagara, the schooner was seldom used as she was designed. Instead she saw considerable action on the Great Lakes throughout the War of 1812. Actively employed in Chauncey's squadron, she assisted in the assault on York, Canada, carrying some of General Henry Dearborn's troops and sailing close inshore to cover the troops with precision fire. A month later, after bringing supplies to troops at York, she joined in the attack on Fort George on 27 May, once again carrying troops and using her gun to advantage. She wreaked havoc among the English troops and forced them to withdraw, blowing up the fort behind them.

Continuing operations on Lake Ontario, Lady of the Lake captured the English schooner Lady Murray with a cargo of ammunition off Presqu'ile, near Brighton, Ontario on 16 June and then operated as a dispatch and supply boat throughout the summer. On 11 September, the schooner was part of the American squadron that engaged the British under Captain Sir James Yeo in an inconclusive, three-hour-long range battle in Lake Ontario. She fought again with the squadron 17 days later off York in a short but fierce engagement that forced the British to retreat into Burlington Bay.

In her last combat on 5 October 1813, she assisted three other American ships in attacking and capturing British schooners Confiance, Hamilton, Mary, and cutter HMS Drummond off False Ducks, Lake Ontario. In 1814, 'The Lady of the Lake' was used as a look-out vessel between the Gallows & Kingston after the ice broke up. On Apr 24, 1814, she ran close into Kingston, Ontario while noting and reporting the condition of the Enemy's current fleet, new ship builds in progress and batteries.[1] For the remainder of the war she carried dispatches between Sackets Harbor and Fort Niagara.

Following the end of the War of 1812, she was placed in ordinary at Sackets Harbor and remained there until sold at public auction on 2 February 1826.
