= Charles G. Ridgely =

United States Navy officer

Charles Goodwin Ridgely
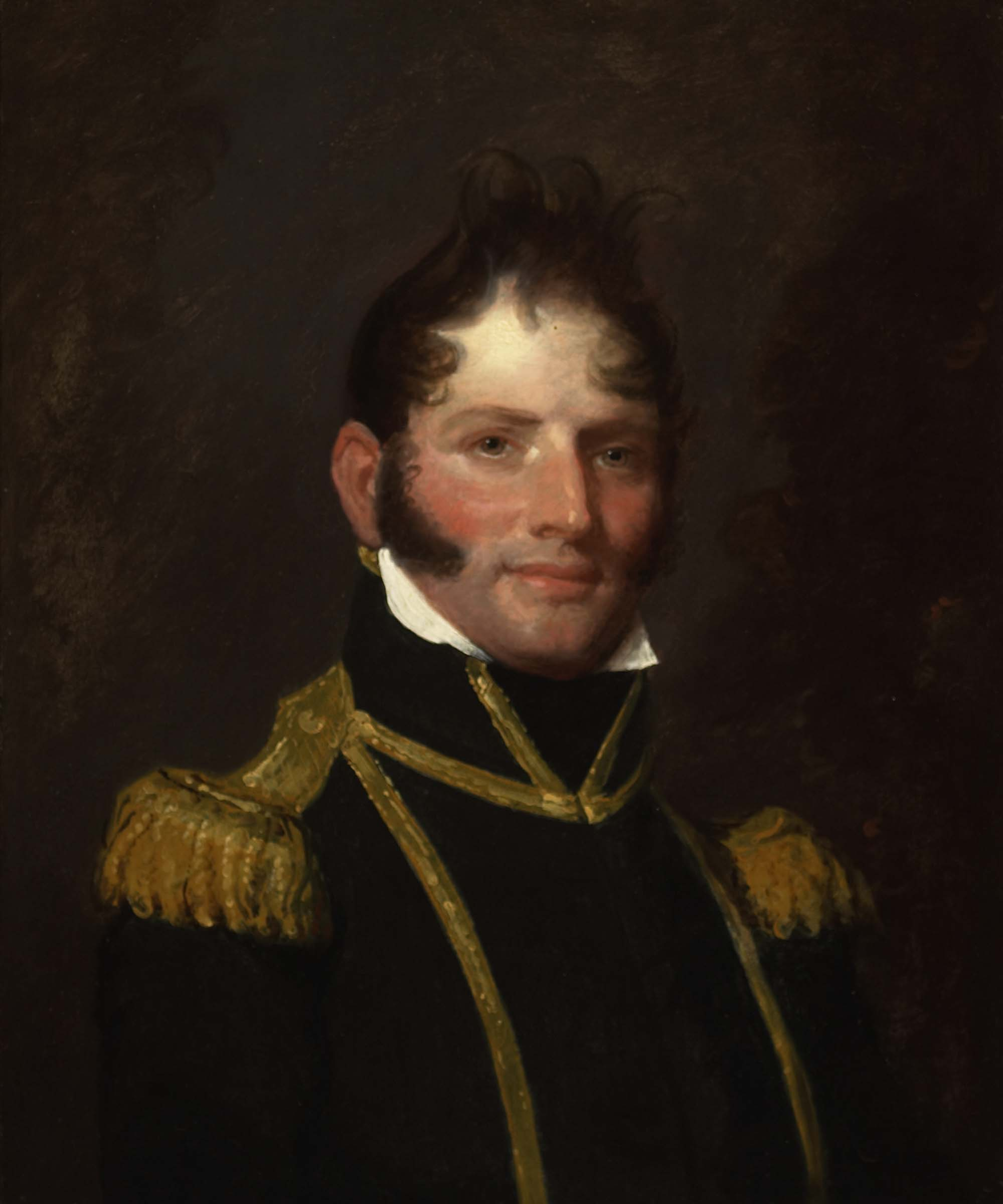
- portrait by Gilbert Stuart, 1819-1820
- Born: Charles Ridgely Goodwin; July 2, 1784; Baltimore, Maryland
- Died: February 8, 1848 (aged 63); Baltimore, Maryland
- Military career
- Allegiance: United States of America
- Branch: United States Navy
- Service years: 1799 – ?
- Rank: Captain
- Commands: USS Jefferson; USS Erie; USS Independence; USS Constellation; Mediterranean Squadron; Pacific Station; West Indies Squadron; Brazil Squadron; Brooklyn Navy Yard
- Conflicts: First Barbary War; Second Battle of Tripoli Harbor; Peruvian War of Independence
- Awards: Sword for the Congressional Gold Medal presented to Edward Preble (1805)

Charles Goodwin Ridgely (Note: Born as Charles Ridgely Goodwin, later legally known as Charles Goodwin Ridgely, signed as Charles L. Ridgely, and also referred to as Charles Goodwin Ridgely.) (July 2, 1784 – February 8, 1848) was an officer in the United States Navy. He fought under Edward Preble in the First Barbary War (1804–1805), before serving as the commander of the Pacific Station (1820–1822), the West Indies Squadron (1827–1830), the Brooklyn Navy Yard (1833–1839), and the Brazil Squadron (1840–1842).

== Early life and family ==
Charles Ridgely Goodwin was born in Baltimore, Maryland on July 2, 1784 to Dr. Lyde Goodwin (February 4, 1754 – August 19, 1801) and Abby Levy (August 12, 1760 – July 29, 1821). After joining the United States Navy, he legally changed to "Charles Goodwin Ridgely" at the behest of his uncle Charles Ridgely III, who also requested that his other nephew Charles Carnan Ridgely change his name from "Charles Ridgely Carnan".

== Career ==
Ridgely was registered as a warranted midshipman in the United States Navy on October 17, 1799.

=== First Barbary War ===
Ridgely served as an officer under Edward Preble during the First Barbary War from 1804 to 1805. For their actions in the Second Battle of Tripoli Harbor, the United States Congress awarded a Congressional Gold Medal to Preble and "through him to the officers, petty officers, seamen and marines attached to the squadron under his command". Congress also presented "swords to each of the commissioned officers and Midshipmen who had distinguished themselves in the several attacks", including Ridgely. (Note: At least one source directly states that Ridgely "had received the congressional gold medal of honor".)

=== Great Lakes and Mediterranean Squadron ===
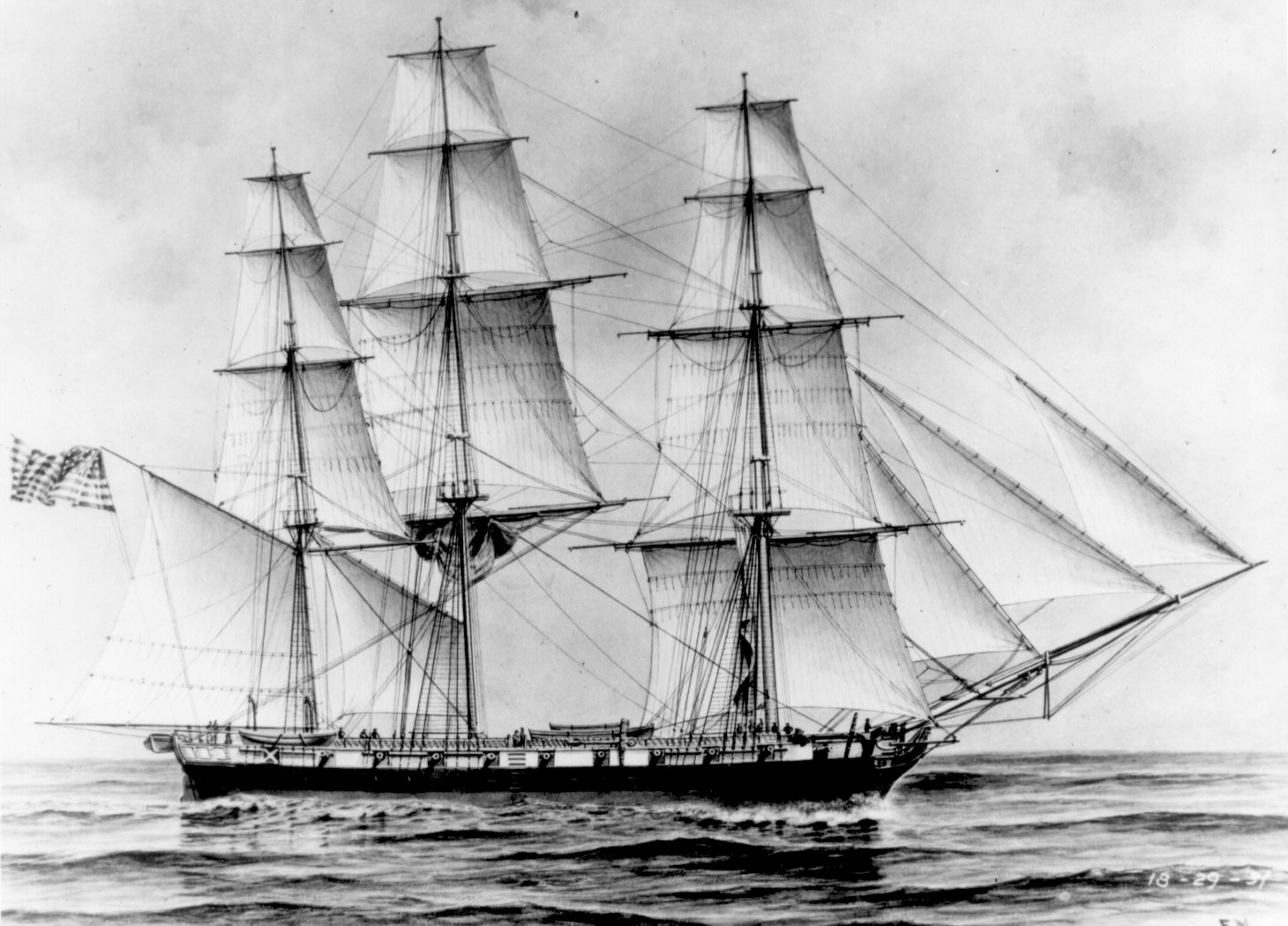
The sloop-of-war USS Erie

He was appointed an acting lieutenant in May 1804 before being commissioned as a lieutenant on February 2, 1807. He was promoted to master commandant on July 24, 1813 and then commanded the USS Jefferson on Lake Ontario in 1814. Ridgely was promoted to captain on February 28, 1815. From 1815 to 1817, he was given command of the USS Erie and the USS Independence in the Mediterranean Squadron.

=== Pacific Squadron and the Peruvian War of Independence ===
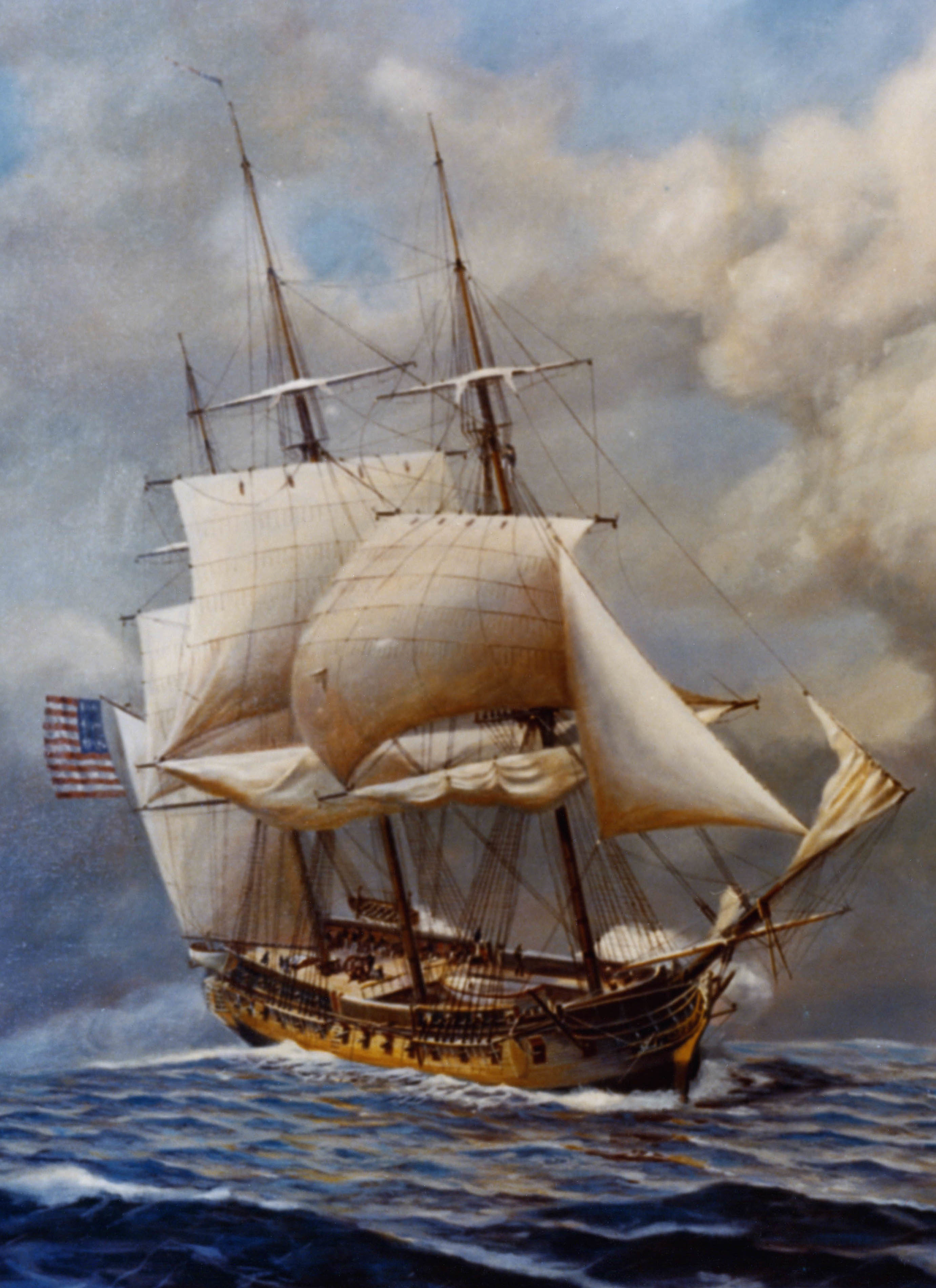
A painting of the frigate USS Constellation

In 1820, Ridgely was placed in command of the Pacific Station and sailed from Boston to his new post. He took the position hoping to support Chilean and Peruvian patriots of the Liberating Expedition of Peru in the Peruvian War of Independence.

During a delay in Rio de Janeiro to have the main mast on the USS Constellation replaced in preparation for rounding Cape Horn, Ridgely sought to reduce their midshipmen casualties to duels by enforcing mandatory pledges to refrain from dueling. 3 of his 29 midshipmen refused and were sent back home to resign their positions, but the Department of the Navy disagreed with Ridgely's policy and allowed them to remain in service. Nevertheless, the USS Constellation did not suffer further losses to duels after the incident.

On January 14, 1821, Ridgely arrived aboard the Constellation in Valparaíso, Chile to relieve John Downes, the previous commander of the Pacific Squadron, and the USS Macedonian. They met in March 1821 and then traveled together to Santiago, Chile to the American chargé d'affaires in Chile and meet Chilean officials. He soon befriended Sir Thomas Hardy commanding the South America Station of the British Royal Navy, but grew discontent with Lord Cochrane of the Chilean Navy and the independence fighters, whom he found to be "base and vulgar". He grew sympathetic towards the Spanish and offered political asylum to the former Viceroy of Peru, Joaquín de la Pezuela, aboard the Constellation, to the protest of the independence fighters.

While he was anchored at Valparaíso in late February 1821, Ridgely took aboard three survivors from the Nantucket whaler Essex who had been adrift for months, including Owen Chase and Thomas Nickerson. He and his crew were deeply moved by the survivors, with Ridgely writing, "[T]heir appearance... was truly distressing, bones working through their skins, their legs and feet much smaller and the whole surface of their bodies one entire ulcer." Ridgely also made arrangements with Thomas Raine, the captain of an Australian trading vessel, to rescue three other survivors of the same wreck who were thought to be marooned on Ducie Island.

Ridgely and HMS Conway independently and unsuccessfully tried to capture the royalist semi-pirate Vicente Benavides, who operated against local patriot vessels and against American shipping in the Pacific. They were unsuccessful but still managed to limit his effectiveness. Ridgely requested additional support from the US Navy as his lone frigate was significantly outgunned by the British and French squadrons. Charles Stewart set sail with the USS Franklin and USS Dolphin in September 1821 and arrived in April 1822 to relieve Ridgely.

=== West Indies Squadron, Brooklyn Navy Yard, and Brazil Squadron ===
From 1827 to 1830, Ridgely served as the flag officer of the West Indies Squadron and engaged in anti-piracy activities. From June 10, 1833 to November 19, 1839, he was the Commandant of the Brooklyn Navy Yard At the Brooklyn Navy Yard, Ridgely also served as the first president of the Naval Lyceum. He was then appointed as the flag officer in command of the Brazil Squadron from 1840 to 1842.

== Death ==
Ridgely died in Baltimore, Maryland on February 8, 1848.

== Personal life ==
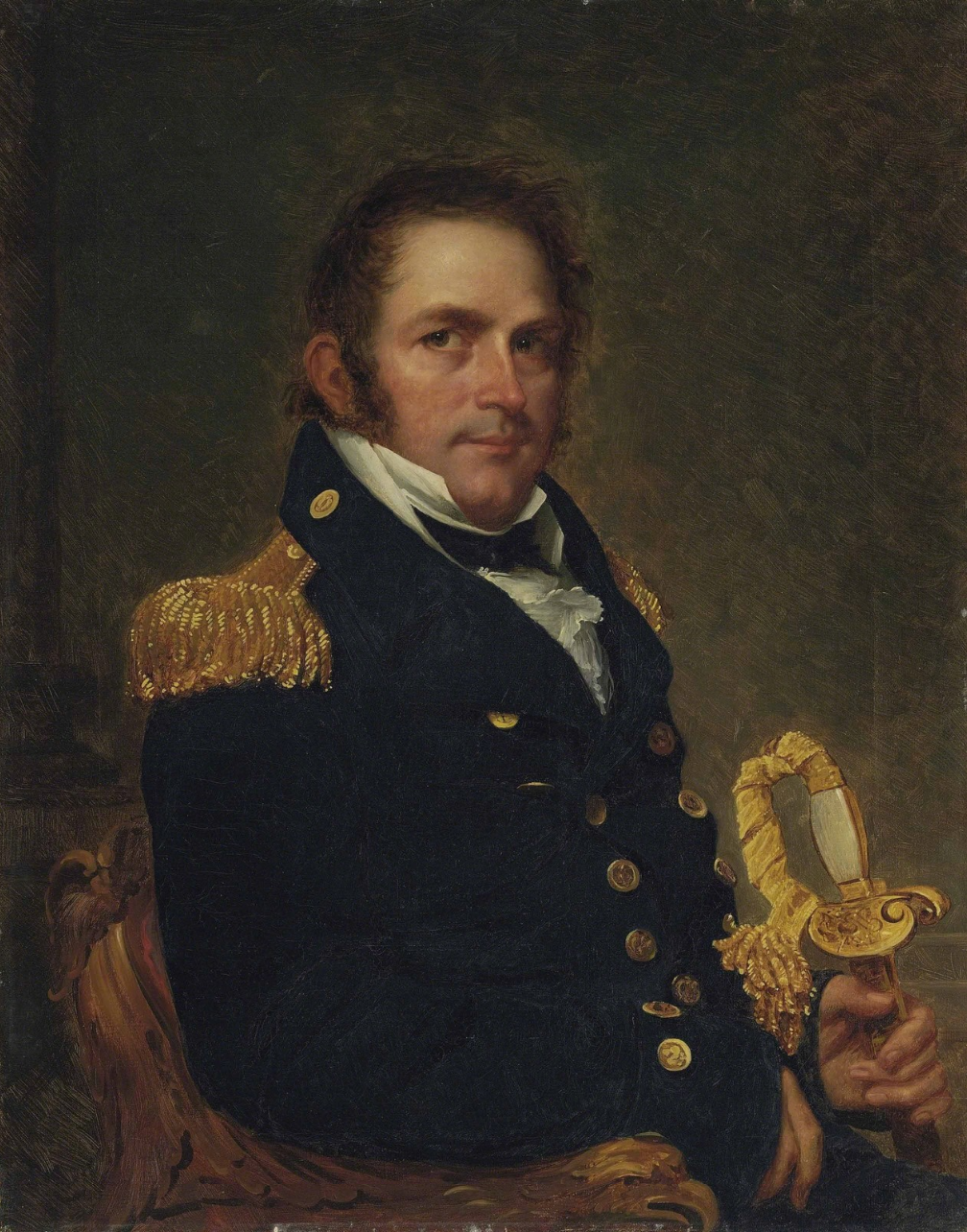
Portrait of a naval officer, possibly Charles Goodwin Ridgely

Ridgely married Cornelia Louisiana Livingston in Clermont-on-Hudson, New York on December 1, 1822. They had four children, including Elizabeth Augusta Ridgely who married William H. Hunt.
