= Melancthon Taylor Woolsey =

Portrait of Woolsey

Melancthon Taylor Woolsey (1782 – 18 May 1838) was an officer in the United States Navy during the War of 1812 and battles on the Great Lakes. He supervised warship construction at Navy Point in Sackets Harbor, New York, and later had a full career in the Navy.

== Early life ==
Woolsey was born near Plattsburgh, New York. He was a son of Melancthon Lloyd Woolsey (1758–1819), a Maj.-Gen. of the New York Militia during the Revolutionary War and Alida (né Livingston) Woolsey (1758–1843), a daughter of the Rev. Henry Gilbert Livingston (a grandson of Robert Livingston, 1st Lord of Livingston Manor).

His paternal grandparents were Col. Melancthon Taylor Woolsey and Rebecca Lloyd. Through his father he was a descendant of George Jarvis Woolsey, an emigrant from England who was one of the earliest settlers of New Amsterdam and married Rebecca Cornell (a daughter of Thomas Cornell), Through his mother, he was a descendant of the Livingston, Schuyler, and Van Rensselaer families.

== Career ==
After studying law for a time, Woolsey entered the Navy as a midshipman on April 9, 1800. His first assignment was the frigate USS Adams, on which he made a cruise to the West Indies in 1800 and 1801. He served briefly in the First Barbary War just before its end in 1805. In 1807, the newly promoted Woolsey received orders to Washington, D.C., where he developed a code of signals for the Navy.

From there, he was ordered to the shores of Lake Ontario in 1808 to supervise the construction of USS Oneida. Given the increase of tensions with Britain, the US Navy established a shipyard for warships and rapidly built eleven ships at the facility, employing 3,000 men at the yard, many recruited from New York City. At the same time, Woolsey received a concurrent assignment as the commanding officer of the shore facilities located there. When the United States declared war on Britain in 1812, he was still in command of Oneida and the shore station at Sackett's Harbor. On July 19, 1812, a British squadron of five ships appeared. Woolsey attempted to escape to open water with Oneida, but the British squadron sealed off that avenue. Instead, he returned to Sackett's Harbor, landed half his battery, and after a sharp two-hour exchange the British squadron broke off the engagement and sailed for Kingston.

Early in October, Commodore Isaac Chauncey arrived on the scene and assumed overall command of American naval activities on the Great Lakes. Woolsey stayed on as second in command and remained commanding officer of Oneida. During the fall of 1812, Woolsey concentrated upon the construction, purchase, and outfitting of additional war vessels. Throughout the entire war, a construction race caused naval dominance on Lake Ontario to alternate between the British and Americans. Woolsey enabled America to grab the lead in the fall of 1812 by acquiring eight schooners to augment Oneida and the three-gun USS Julia. On November 8, he commanded Oneida when the 19-gun warship and four of the newly acquired schooners encountered HMS Royal George —a large, 24-gun, ship-rigged sloop-of-war off Kingston and chased her into that port. Later, they followed her in and subjected her to bombardment. In May 1813, Woolsey commanded Oneida as her guns supported the capture of York (Toronto) and the assault on Fort George.

Woolsey was promoted to master commandant in July 1813 and, by August, was in the new schooner USS Sylph. Late in September 1813, he commanded his ship in a running fight between the American lake flotilla and British Commodore James Lucas Yeo's force. That series of skirmishes resulted in another period of American dominance of Lake Ontario. On 5 October, his ship participated in the capture of the British cutter HMS Drummond and the sloops-of-war HMS Elizabeth, HMS Mary Ann, and HMS Lady Gore off False Duck Island.

In May 1814, after a winter of feverish preparation for the third summer of campaigning, Woolsey went to the supply depot at Oswego to pick up guns, cables, and other supplies needed at Sackett's Harbor. While he was there, a British squadron appeared off Oswego. By spreading false intelligence about his destination, Woolsey was able to take advantage of a dark night and make good his escape. The British learned of Woolsey's deception and sought to overtake him, which they did at Sandy Creek. Woolsey had prepared an ambush in concert with Major Daniel Appling and his 150-man contingent of the United States Rifle Regiment. A landing force sent by the British squadron was attacked by Appling's riflemen and 200 Indian allies. Woolsey, in turn, brought his guns to bear on the squadron itself. The Americans defeated the landing force, killing 10, wounding 52, and capturing the rest. Woolsey proceeded to Sackett's Harbor with his ordnance and supplies. Soon thereafter, he assumed command of the new brig, USS Jones, and retained that command until the end of the war in 1815.

=== Later life ===
Woolsey left Sacketts Harbor in 1824 to assume command of the frigate, USS Constellation. He took it on a West Indies cruise until June 1827.

Late in 1827, he took command of the navy yard at Pensacola, Florida and moved his family there. He held the position until 1831. Between 1832 and 1834, Woolsey served as Commodore in command of the Brazilian Station.

His last active duty took him to the Chesapeake Bay, where he supervised surveys from 1836 until his health began to decline in 1837.

== Personal life ==
After the war, Master Commandant Woolsey remained in command of the naval station at Sacketts Harbor. In 1816, he was promoted to captain and likely married Susan Cornelia Treadwell of Long Island, New York that year. Together, they were the parents of:

- Melancthon Brooks Woolsey (1817–1874), who married Mary Louisa Morrison, a daughter of Joseph Morrison of Baltimore.
- James Treadwell Woolsey (1820–1894).
- Alida Livingston Woolsey (1822–1859), who married Rev. Isaac Pierson Stryker; their son, M. Woolsey Stryker, became a Presbyterian minister and President of Hamilton College.
- Robert Henry Woolsey (1824–1886), who married Mary Ann Bush in 1869.
- Susan Cornelia Woolsey (b. 1828), who married Russel W. R. Freeman in 1855.
- Mary Elizabeth Woolsey (b. 1831), who married Samuel H. Cary; after his death she married Rev. Francis Windsor Brathwaite.
- Richard Lansing Woolsey (1835–1910), who married Caroline Heming.
- Henry Livingston Woolsey

Commodore Woolsey died May 18, 1838, at Utica, New York.

== Honors ==
The United States Navy named two destroyers in his honor: USS Woolsey (DD-77) and USS Woolsey (DD-437) commemorating both him and his son, Commodore Melancthon Brooks Woolsey.
