= HMS Sir Isaac Brock =

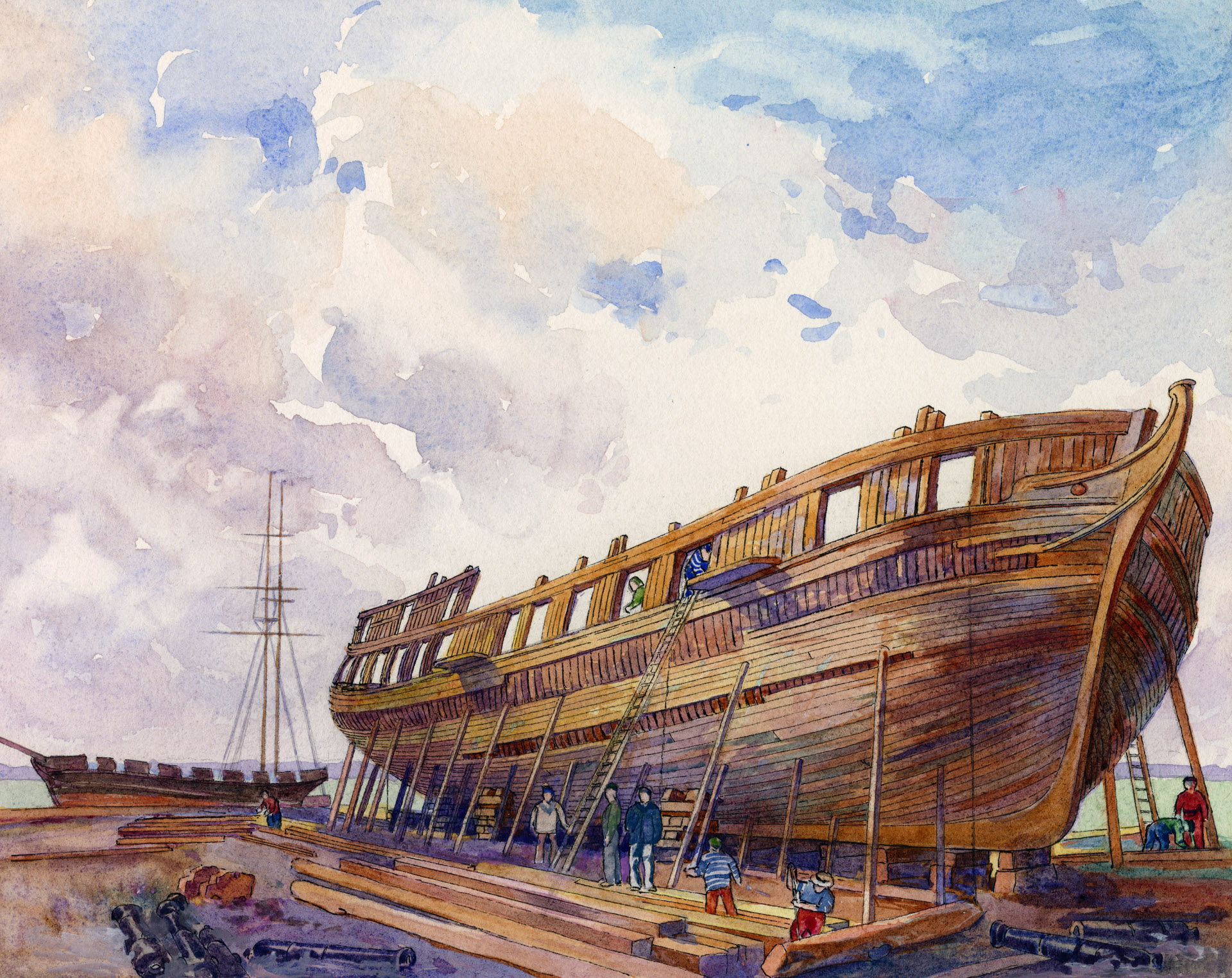
- Incomplete HMS Sir Issac Brock in York, 1813.

History

United Kingdom
- Name: Sir Isaac Brock
- Builder: Thomas Plucknett, York
- Fate: Unfinished, burned on stocks

General characteristics
- Type: Sloop-of-war
- Tons burthen: 637
- Complement: 220 (if finished)
- Armament: 24 guns (if finished)

HMS Sir Isaac Brock was a warship which was destroyed before being completed at York, Upper Canada during the War of 1812. The ship was named after the famed hero of the war, Major General Sir Isaac Brock.

== History ==
At the end of 1812, the British learned that the Americans were building warships at Sackett's Harbor, New York, and laid down two sloops of war in response. Construction of Sir Isaac Brock began at York.

The new ship was a sister ship to HMS Wolfe, which was constructed at Kingston. Although construction on both ships began around the same time, as the end of April 1813 approached, Wolfe was very nearly ready to be launched while Sir Isaac Brock was still many weeks away from being complete. She had been partially planked on her starboard side but was not even close to that far along on her port side. Most of the responsibility for the delay in readiness could be laid on the shoulders of shipyard Superintendent, Thomas Plucknett.

The ship had a registered weight of 637 tons, and was rated as having 24 guns. In fact, the rating system often omitted carronades, and Sir Isaac Brock would have had 30 guns or even more in service. (Wolfe was completed with a medley of whatever guns were available).

Late in the afternoon 26 April 1813, the American flotilla was sighted off York, with a strong embarked force of infantry and artillerymen. The next day, the Battle of York was fought. The outnumbered British regulars and militia were forced to fall back. The Lieutenant Governor of Upper Canada, Major General Roger Hale Sheaffe, ordered his regulars to retreat to Kingston, but also dispatched Captain Francis Tito LeLièvre (1794-1830) of the Royal Newfoundland Regiment to set fire to Sir Isaac Brock to prevent her falling intact into enemy hands. LeLièvre may have been assisted in this task by Thomas Plucknett, as shipyard superintendent was the man most responsible for Sir Isaac Brock being in her partially built condition.

The Americans were enraged to find that the ship had apparently been set ablaze while negotiations for surrender with the local militia were still taking place. When eventually, a surrender was arranged, Sir Isaac Brock had been reduced to charred timbers.

== See also ==
- Engagements on Lake Ontario
