= USS General Pike =

Corvette of the United States Navy

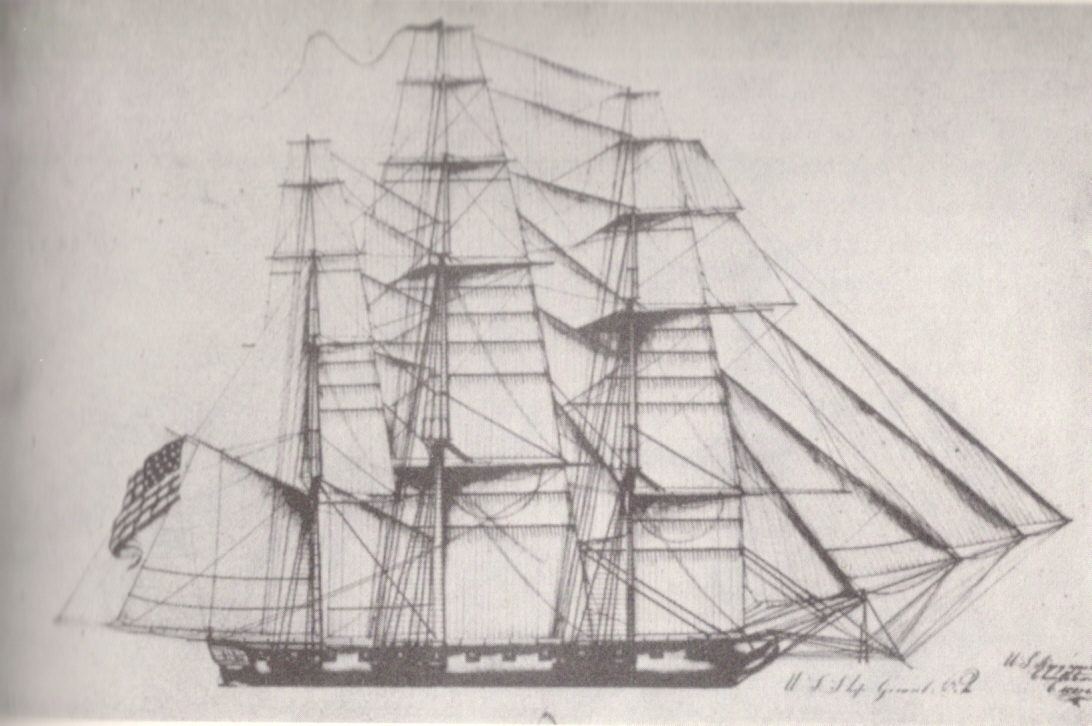
- Sail plan of USS General Pike

History

United States
- Name: USS General Pike
- Namesake: Zebulon Pike (1779–1813)
- Builder: Henry Eckford, Sacket's Harbor
- Laid down: 9 April 1813
- Launched: 12 June 1813
- Fate: Sold, 1825

General characteristics
- Type: Corvette
- Tons burthen: 875, or 900 (bm)
- Length: 145 ft (44.2 m)
- Beam: 37 ft (11.3 m)
- Depth: 15 ft (4.6 m)
- Propulsion: Sail
- Complement: 392 officers and enlisted + 40 marines (432 total)
- Armament: 26 × 24-pounder guns, including 2 on pivots

USS General Pike was a corvette in the United States Navy, which took part in Engagements on Lake Ontario during the Anglo-American War of 1812. She was launched in June 1813 and took part in several indecisive battles on the Great Lakes. She was laid up at the end of the war and was sold in 1825.

== Origin ==
She was named for Brigadier General Zebulon Pike, who was killed by an exploding enemy magazine at the Battle of York on 26 April 1813. The ship was laid down on 9 April 1813 at Sackets Harbor, New York, by Henry Eckford, a New York City shipbuilder who supervised the construction of warships on Lake Ontario. The ship was roughly the same dimensions as the frigate USS Essex, and the largest yet built on any of the Great Lakes.

From the outset, Commodore Isaac Chauncey, the American naval commander on the lakes, wanted the new ship to be armed with a broadside of long guns with longer range than the carronades mounted on most of the vessels of the opposing British squadron. General Pike was therefore fitted with 26 of the Pattern 1794 24-pounder long guns originally fitted to the USS Constitution, but since replaced. Two of these guns were mounted on pivots on the topgallant forecastle (a platform above the forward gun deck) and the poop deck, and could fire on either broadside.

On 29 May, the British under Lieutenant General Sir George Prevost and Commodore Sir James Lucas Yeo attacked Sacket's Harbor, intending to destroy General Pike before it could be launched. During the resulting battle of Sackett's Harbor, the Americans feared that the town was about to be captured and prematurely set fire to General Pike and vast quantities of stores. The British called off the attack at this point and the ship was saved, although $500,000 worth of materials had been destroyed.

== Service history ==
General Pike was launched on 12 June. Master Commandant Arthur Sinclair was appointed to command. The fitting out and setting up of rigging was delayed by the loss of the stores during the earlier battle but the ship was made ready to sail by July and joined Chauncey's squadron on 21 July. From then until the end of the year, General Pike usually served as Chauncey's flagship. She sailed to the head of Lake Ontario, arriving off Niagara on 24 July. While cruising the lake, General Pike engaged British ships under Commodore Yeo in an indecisive battle on 10–11 August.

General Pike returned to Sackett's Harbor on 13 August and provisioned before returning to the head of the lake to search out British ships. After almost a month of manoeuvering and stalking to gain an advantage over the British, the ship was engaged in a brief encounter against the British off the mouth of the Genesee River on 11 September. On 28 September the two forces again met at York Bay, and engaged in a fierce, but ultimately still indecisive battle. As Chauncey had hoped and Yeo had feared, General Pike's heavy broadside partly dismasted Yeo's flagship, the sloop of war Wolfe. The British squadron immediately fled downwind into Burlington Bay. The Americans could not overtake the British as many of the fastest American vessels were towing the slowest schooners to prevent them being left behind. General Pike was towing the schooner Asp and Chauncey refused to cast loose the tow during the chase. Chauncey called off the chase when the British anchored in Burlington Bay and the rising wind threatened to drive both squadrons onto the lee shore, which was British territory.

General Pike had inflicted heavy damage, but because the British fire had been concentrated on her, had also suffered severely. Wolfe had brought down her mizzen topmast and during the pursuit, the main topgallant mast had also fallen and the rigging of the foremast and bowsprit had been damaged. There were several hits below the waterline forward, and a cannon had exploded, killing or wounding twenty men and damaging the topgallant forecastle. Four other guns also were badly cracked and threatened to burst.

After returning to Sackett's Harbor for repairs early in October, General Pike supported troop movements against the British at the lower end of Lake Ontario until mid-November when she returned to the Niagara Peninsula to cover the transfer of American troops from Fort Niagara to Sackett's Harbor. She remained at Sackett's Harbor during the winter months. Sinclair had received promotion to Captain during the year and asked for an independent command. He was later appointed to command on Lake Erie. His replacement in command of General Pike was Master Commandant William M. Crane.

Throughout the remainder of the War of 1812, General Pike continued to operate with Chauncey's squadron, although no longer as flagship once Chauncey had commissioned two larger frigates. After the British withdrew blockading ships from Sackett's Harbor early in June 1814, General Pike joined other American ships in a counter-blockade of the British squadron at Kingston. The Americans kept Yeo's ships confined to Kingston harbor, and General Pike cruised Lake Ontario freely from the head of the St. Lawrence River to Sackett's Harbor until October, when the American squadron withdrew into its base.

== Fate ==
Following the end of the war, General Pike was laid up at Sackett's Harbor. She was sold in 1825.
