= USS Ontario (1812) =

History

United States
- Name: USS Ontario
- Acquired: Purchased, October 1812
- Commissioned: 1813
- Fate: Sold, 15 May 1815

General characteristics
- Type: Schooner
- Displacement: 81 long tons (82 t)
- Propulsion: Sail
- Armament: 2 × guns

USS Ontario was a lake schooner in the United States Navy during the War of 1812.

Ontario was built as a merchant ship on Lake Ontario; purchased in October 1812; and placed in service in 1813, Sailing Master Joseph Stevens in command.

Part of Commodore Isaac Chauncey's tiny Lake Ontario squadron protecting upstate New York from a seaborne British and Canadian invasion, Ontario supported an attack on York, Canada, on 27 April 1813. General Zebulon Pike landed 1700 troops to raid the town while the U.S. squadron destroyed large quantities of stores and burned a schooner under construction. The warship then cooperated with troops attacking Fort George on 27 May, forcing a British evacuation of the Niagara Frontier. She then patrolled the Lake against British warship and merchantmen movements into the summer.

From 7–11 August, Ontario, still with Chauncey's 13-ship squadron, fought a running engagement with British Captain James Yeo's 6-ship group. Losing two ships on the 8th to heavy weather, the squadron had two more captured during the inconclusive exchange of fire on the 10th. A further sea fight on the 11th brought no more results but finally, a battle off York on 28 August succeeded in damaging two British ships and forced the enemy to flee into Burlington Bay.

For the next year and one-half, Ontario remained on Lake Ontario on patrol against any British invasion attempts. Laid up in ordinary following the end of the War of 1812, the converted commercial schooner was sold on 15 May 1815 and returned to merchant service.
