= USS Jefferson (1814) =

U.S. Navy brig

History

United States
- Name: Jefferson
- Launched: 7 April 1814
- Fate: Sold, 30 April 1825

General characteristics
- Type: Brig
- Displacement: 509 long tons (517 t)
- Length: 117 ft (36 m)
- Propulsion: Sail
- Complement: 160 officers and enlisted
- Armament: 16 × 42-pounder carronades; 4 × 24-pounder long guns

USS Jefferson was a brig in the United States Navy during the War of 1812. She was named for Founding Father and third U.S. president Thomas Jefferson.

== Service history ==
Jefferson was built at Sackett's Harbor, New York, for service in Commodore Isaac Chauncey's fleet on Lake Ontario and launched 7 April 1814. She was manned by a crew from sloop of war Erie which had been laid up at Baltimore because of the British blockade of Chesapeake Bay. Comdr. Charles G. Ridgeley was her captain. Notable Master Gunner George Marshall, a warrant officer, was responsible for the ship's artillery. Marshall was also from the Erie.

Most of the guns for the new American ships had not reached Sackett's Harbor by 19 May when the British fleet arrived off the American base and began a strict blockade. Jefferson finally sailed with Chauncey's fleet on 31 July and arrived off Niagara on 5 August. Eleven days prior to the arrival of the USS Jefferson the Battle of Lundy's Lane occurred at Niagara Falls. It was one of the bloodiest battles of the war, and one of the deadliest battles ever fought in Canada. The British Siege of Fort Erie was also still ongoing.

With the Sylph and Oneida, Jefferson set up a blockade while Chauncey with the rest of the fleet sailed on to Kingston, Ontario to challenge the main British squadron. Several ships were blocked in the Niagara River. The blockade also prevented British supplies and troops from entering the Niagara River at the Lake Ontario entrance. Naval ships could not travel from Lake Ontario to Lake Erie because of Niagara Falls. British ships would use a portage road traveling 11 miles to naval ships closer to Lake Erie. The blockade stopped this crucial artery while the Siege of Fort Erie raged on, aiding US forces. The crews of the vessels gained experience in amphibious warfare.

After remaining on blockade duty off Niagara for over a month, Jefferson sailed for Kingston to rejoin Chauncey. The ship's crew also captured several small British vessels. During the passage, on 12 September, a severe storm arose, which before abating three days later, almost swamped the brig. Ten of her guns were thrown overboard in the struggle to save the ship.

Jefferson rejoined her fleet on 17 September and operated with it during the remainder of the navigation season attempting to draw Sir James Yeo's ships into a decisive contest. Toward the end of November she was laid up for the winter.

Peace obviated Jefferson's planned return to commission in the spring. She remained in ordinary until sold on 30 April 1825.

== Bibliography ==
- Heidler, David Stephen; Heidler, Jeanne T. (September 2004). Encyclopedia of the War of 1812. Naval Institute Press. ISBN 978-1-59114-362-8.
- Belanger, Jeff (January 2009). Ghosts of War: Restless Spirits of Soldiers, Spies, and Saboteurs. The Rosen Publishing Group. ISBN 978-1-4358-5177-1.
