= USS Oneida (1809) =

US Navy brig

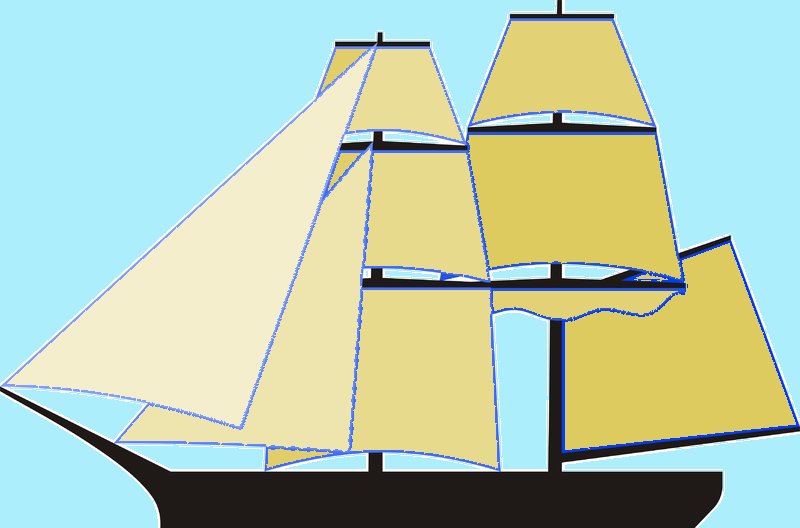
- Configuration of typical brig-sloop

History

United States
- Name: USS Oneida
- Laid down: 1808
- Launched: 1809
- Commissioned: 1810
- Fate: Sold 15 May 1815, afterwards repurchased, laid up, and sold in 1825

General characteristics
- Type: Brig
- Displacement: 243 long tons (247 t)
- Propulsion: Sail
- Complement: 100
- Armament: 16 × 24-pounder carronades

The first USS Oneida was a brig of war in the United States Navy during the War of 1812.

Oneida was built at Oswego, New York 1808–1809, under contract awarded by her first commanding officer, Lieutenant M. T. Woolsey, to Henry Eckford and Christian Bergh. Although her displacement was 243 tons by carpenter's measurement, her draft could compare with a sloop of 80 tons. This enabled her to enter the rivers feeding Lake Ontario without fear of grounding. She was delivered by the contractors in the spring of 1809, but was not equipped and sent upon the lake until the fall of 1810.

== War of 1812 ==
Oneida operated principally from Sackets Harbor, New York, not far from the commencement of the St. Lawrence, while the British port of Kingston lay nearly opposite in Canada.

=== First Battle of Sacket's Harbor ===
On 5 June 1812, Oneida captured the British schooner Lord Nelson, while enforcing the Embargo Act of 1807. On 19 July, the British squadron sailed on Sackets Harbor where Oneida and her prize were anchored. After failing to gain the open lake, Oneida anchored again near a bank in a position to rake the harbor entrance. She mounted the guns from her off side ashore and presented a full battery. After an exchange of cannonade, of two hours duration, the British squadron broke off the engagement and sailed for Kingston, Canada.

=== USS Oneida vs HMS Royal George ===
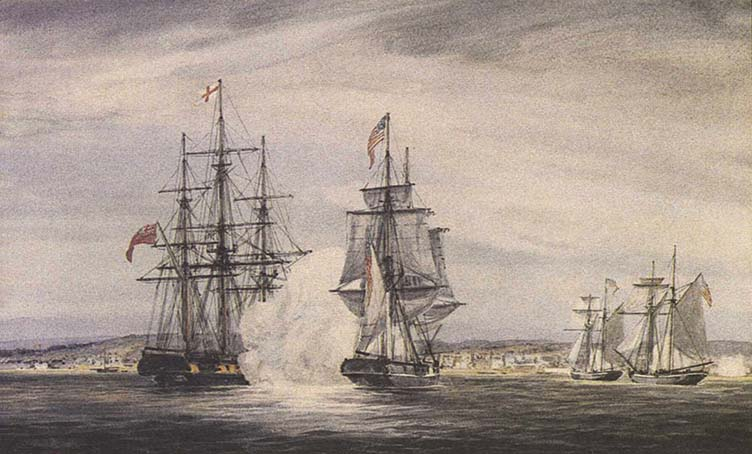
Depiction of the engagement of the Oneida and Royal George in Kingston harbour, 10 November 1812.

On 8 November, Oneida, flying the broad pennant of Commodore Isaac Chauncey, sailed from Sackets Harbor to intercept British ships conveying supplies to the Army at Kingston. The sloop HMS Royal George was sighted and chased into the Bay of Quinte and lost sight of during the night. Sighted again the following morning, the chase was resumed. Oneida brought up the rear of the squadron to allow the heavy guns of her schooners to open way for a close attack. Royal George cut her mooring cables and attempted to make further headway up the channel, finally making fast to a wharf under the protection of troop muskets. Royal George suffered extensive damage, and Oneida had some damage aloft with one seaman killed and three wounded, but a gale ended the engagement and the Americans returned to Sackets Harbor.

=== Battle of York ===
On 25 April 1813, along with other ships of the American squadron, Oneida set sail from Sackets Harbor and arrived off York, Canada (now Toronto) on 27 April with troops under General Zebulon Pike embarked. Boats were hoisted out and within two hours the brigade was ashore, soon capturing York despite the loss of General Pike. On the night of 26 May she again embarked troops and artillery and set sail with the squadron for Fort George, Canada. A landing was made about 9 a.m. on 27 May, and by noon the town and fort were taken.

Oneida made a second unopposed landing at York on 27 July liberating prisoners and seizing provisions. On 31 July 1814, Oneida made for the Niagara River to blockade British ships anchored there. She was assisted by the brig Jefferson and the schooner Sylph, while the remainder of the American Squadron blockaded Kingston. The blockade was lifted in September 1814, and Oneida returned to Sackets Harbor. Ice closed the lake in November, and peace was declared the following month.

== Postwar ==
Oneida was sold 15 May 1815, but afterwards was repurchased by the Navy, laid up at Sackets Harbor, and finally sold in 1825 to a timber company in the village of Clayton, New York.

Oneida worked as a timber ship for several years before sinking in French Creek Bay near Clayton sometime in the 1830s. One of the ship's cannons is currently in Clayton's Memorial Park, while one of its anchors is in the possession of French Creek Bay Marina.

== See also ==
- Cruizer-class brig-sloop
- Bibliography of early American naval history
