= USS Jones (1814) =

US Navy brig

History

United States
- Name: USS Jones
- Launched: 10 April 1814
- Fate: Sold and scrapped 1821

General characteristics
- Type: Brig
- Displacement: 509 long tons (517 t)
- Length: 117 ft 11 in (35.94 m)
- Propulsion: Sail
- Complement: 160 officers and enlisted
- Armament: 16 × 42-pounder carronades; 4 × 24-pounder guns

USS Jones was a brig in the United States Navy during the War of 1812.

Jones was built at Sacketts Harbor, New York, for service in Commodore Isaac Chauncey's fleet on Lake Ontario and was launched on 10 April 1814.

Most of the cannon for the new American ships had not reached Sackett's Harbor on 19 May when the British fleet arrived off the American base and established a strict blockade which temporarily bottled up the heavily outgunned American squadron. After the British commander, Sir James Yeo, raised the blockade on 6 June, an epidemic struck the American fleet causing further delay.

Jones sailed with Chauncey's vessels on 31 July and arrived off Niagara on 5 August. As the American ships approached the port, now in British hands, they intercepted enemy brig HMS Charwell and chased her ashore where her crew set her ablaze. Chauncey then sailed to Kingston via York (now Toronto) arriving on 9 August. The next day Jones and the schooner Conquest were ordered to cruise between Oswego and Sackett's Harbor protecting American communications.

Jones rejoined the fleet on 17 September and operated with it during the remainder of the navigation season attempting to draw Sir James Yeo's ships into a decisive contest. Toward the end of November she returned to Sackett's Harbor, where she served as a receiving ship for several years after the end of the war. She was sold and broken up in 1821.
