= USS Julia (1812) =

History

United States
- Name: USS Julia
- Acquired: September 1812
- Fate: Captured by the British, 10 August 1813

United Kingdom
- Name: HMS Confiance
- Acquired: 10 August 1813
- Fate: Recaptured by the Americans, 5 October 1813

United States
- Name: USS Julia
- Acquired: 5 October 1813
- Fate: Retired, about 1813

General characteristics in naval service
- Type: Schooner
- Tons burthen: 53 bm
- Propulsion: Sail
- Complement: 40
- Armament: 2 guns

USS Julia was a schooner in the United States Navy during the War of 1812. Initially the privately-owned schooner Julia, she was captured at the onset of the war by armed boats looking for violators of President James Madison's embargo of trade with the British. Purchased by the United States Navy, the vessel was armed with two guns and made part of the squadron on Lake Ontario. Julia took part in the Battle of York and the Battle of Fort George. In August 1813, the schooner was captured by the Royal Navy after failing to execute a turn and was put in service as HMS Confiance. The vessel continued as a warship in British service for a couple of weeks before being converted to a troop transport. In October, Confiance was recaptured by the Americans and renamed Julia. No longer considered capable as a warship, the vessel was retired from service.

== Description and early career ==
Julia was a schooner constructed at Oswego, New York and launched in 1811 for trade on the Great Lakes. Measuring 53 tons burthen, Julia was taken as a prize in June 1812 on the upper Saint Lawrence River by armed boats of the United States Navy for having violated President James Madison embargo of trade with the British. The master of Julia had failed to gain the proper certification showing that the schooner had cleared its last American port.

== War of 1812 ==
In September 1812, Lieutenant Melancthon T. Woolsey purchased Julia for the Navy on Lake Ontario for $3,800. The ship was fitted with two guns, a 32-pounder (15 kg) long gun on a pivot and a 16-pounder (7.3 kg) gun and the ship had a complement of 40. Julia sailed from Sackets Harbor on 8 November 1812 with Commodore Isaac Chauncey's flotilla. That afternoon lookouts on the American ships spotted Royal George, flagship of the Provincial Marine, off False Ducks Island and sent her fleeing into the Bay of Quinte where she escaped due to nightfall. The next morning they again sighted her and resumed the chase. When the British ship reached the shelter of the shore batteries at Kingston, Upper Canada, Chauncey decided to follow her in to test the strength of the defenses and, if possible, to capture the warship. Led by Conquest and Julia, Chauncey's vessels, stood toward the harbor entrance despite the fire from on shore and Royal George.

Approaching nightfall and threatening weather forced Chauncey to retreat to Wolfe Island where he anchored hoping to resume the action the next day. However, poor weather on the morning of 10 November ruled out a renewal of the attack and forced the Americans to return to Sackett's Harbor. As the flotilla retired, the British merchant ship Governor Simcoe was spotted and the Americans gave chase. Although fire from Julia, Governor Tompkins, and Hamilton damaged Governor Simcoe considerably, the merchant ship managed to escape. The American flotilla returned to Sackets Harbor on 12 November before departing again on 13 November. They chased Earl of Moira, another Provincial Marine ship as it neared Kingston. They failed to catch up with the ship and Earl of Moira got away. The flotilla returned to Sackets Harbor. The American fleet was laid up for the winter months on the Great Lakes.

With the return of good weather, Chauncey's ships sortied from Sackets Harbor on 23 April 1813 in cooperation with 1,700 soldiers of the United States Army under General Henry Dearborn, but were forced to return due to gale. On 25 April 1813, they departed for a raid on York (now Toronto), Upper Canada. Two days later, after landing the troops, Julia and her fellow ships supported them with grapeshot enabling them to repulse counterattacks by Indians and British troops while successfully taking York. The American loot included large amounts of naval and military stores and the British brig Duke of Gloucester. Moreover, the 24-gun Sir Isaac Brock nearing completion was burned at York.

On 8 May, the squadron departed York to transport troops and provisions of General Dearborn's army for the campaign on the Niagara Peninsula. On 27 May, Julia and Growler led the flotilla into the Niagara River to open an attack on Fort George by shelling a British battery dug in near the lighthouse. The other American ships took pre-assigned positions where they shelled targets ashore. Meanwhile, Captain Oliver Hazard Perry directed the disembarkation of troops. In three hours, the carefully coordinated attack drove the defenders from the field.

With the fall of Fort George, the British retreated from the Niagara region. As the Americans were attacking the Niagara region, the British assaulted Chauncey's base at Sackets Harbor on 27 May. The port's defenses were significantly damaged before Chauncey's flotilla could return and affected Chauncey's willingness to leave his base unprotected. In July, the American and British squadrons sailed onto Lake Ontario. On 7 August, the American squadron encountered the British squadron, but no battle occurred.

== Capture, British service and fate ==
On the night of 7–8 August, Julia rescued a number of survivors of Scourge after that schooner had capsized and sunk in a heavy gale off Twelve Mile Creek. During the next three days, the American flotilla and the British squadron maneuvered seeking to move into an advantageous position for a general engagement. On 10 August Julia and Growler were cut off from the flotilla after their commanders executed an incorrect turn and were captured. The British renamed the schooners Confiance and Hamilton respectively and incorporated them into their squadron for several weeks. As they were slow, they were re-purposed as troop transports. Chauncey recaptured them near False Ducks Islands on 5 October when he intercepted a convoy of seven troop transports. However, the schooners, having proven unstable in heavy seas, were soon retired from service.
