= USS Conquest (1812) =

Schooner of the United States Navy

History

United States
- Name: USS Conquest
- Acquired: by purchase, 8 October 1812
- Fate: Sold, May 1815

General characteristics
- Type: Schooner
- Displacement: 82 long tons (83 t)
- Propulsion: Sail
- Armament: 3 × guns

The first USS Conquest was a schooner in the United States Navy during the War of 1812.

Conquest, formerly the merchant ship Genesee Packet, was purchased 8 October 1812 at Oswego, New York, for service on Lake Ontario under Commodore Isaac Chauncey.

Commanded by Lieutenant J. D. Elliott, Conquest cruised constantly on Lake Ontario during the War of 1812, taking part in the attacks on Kingston on 9 December 1812; York (now Toronto) on 27 April 1813; and Fort George on 27 May 1813. She joined in the engagements with the British squadron of 7 to 11 August, 11 and 28 September 1813.

She was laid up at Sacketts Harbor, New York, at the end of the war and sold there in May 1815.
