= USS Growler (1812 schooner) =

19th-century schooner

History

United States
- Name: USS Growler
- Launched: As Experiment
- Acquired: Purchased, 1812
- Fate: Captured by the British, 10 August 1813

United Kingdom
- Name: HMS Growler
- Acquired: 10 August 1813
- Fate: Re-captured by the Americans, 5 October 1813

United States
- Name: Growler
- Acquired: 5 October 1813
- Fate: Captured by the British, 5 May 1814

United Kingdom
- Name: HMS Hamilton
- Acquired: 5 May 1814

General characteristics
- Type: Schooner
- Tons burthen: 53 (bm)
- Propulsion: Sail
- Armament: 4 × 4-pounder guns; 1 × 32-pounder carronade

USS Growler was a 53-ton wooden schooner of 5 guns that served in the War of 1812, changing hands three times.

The United States purchased Growler as Experiment on Lake Ontario during 1812, and was first commanded by Sailing Master M.P. Mix. She was actively employed with Isaac Chauncey's squadron on Lake Ontario from 1812 to 1814. Growler took part in attacks on Kingston, York, and Fort George, and the engagement with the British squadron 7–11 August 1813.

The British captured her on 10 August 1813, but USS Sylph recaptured her on 5 October 1813. Growler was libelled and purchased by the United States Navy, rejoining the squadron.

The British captured her again 5 May 1814 at Oswego, New York, and she was taken into the Royal Navy as HMS Hamilton.
