= HMS Moira =

British 14-gun schooner

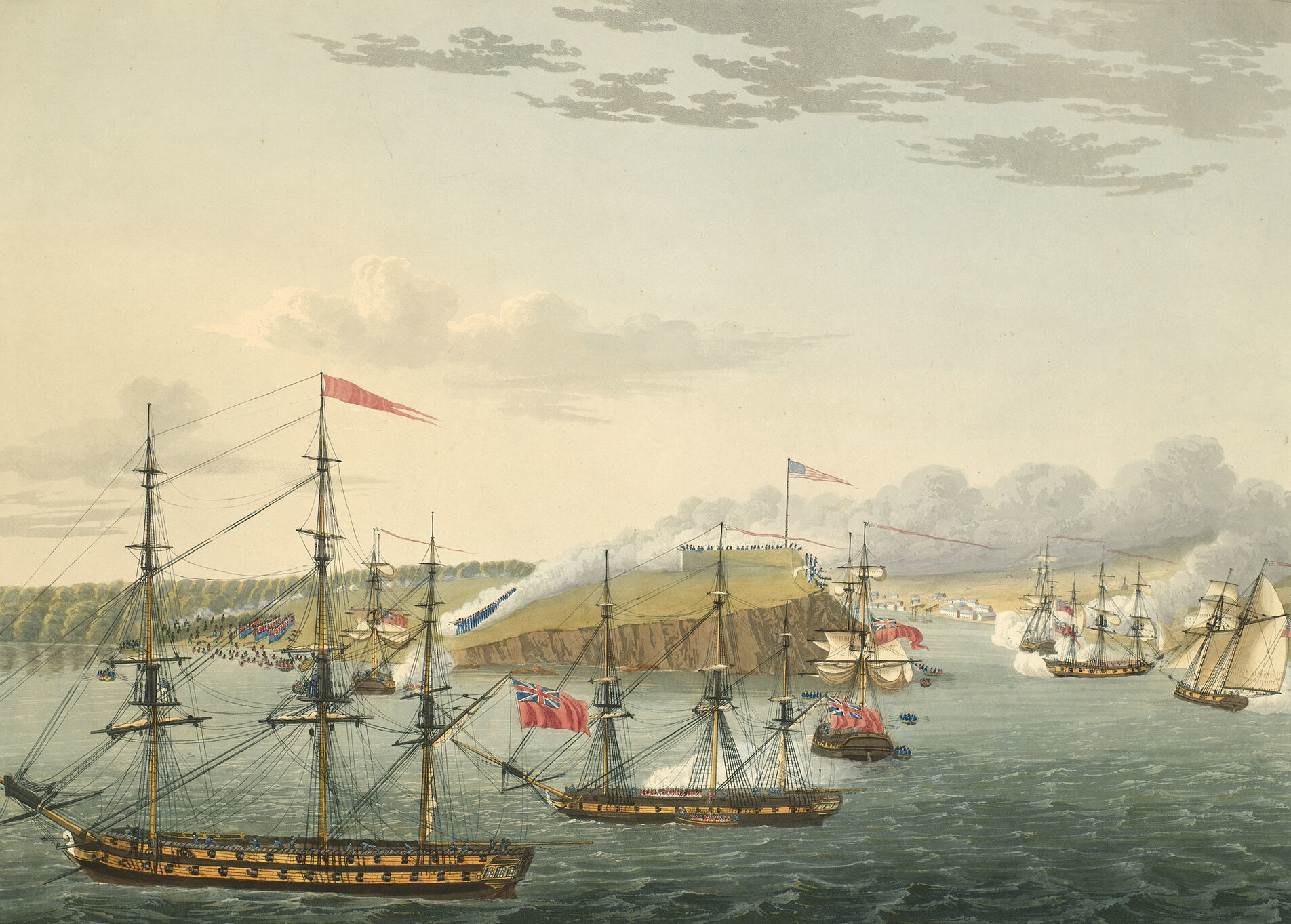
- The attack on Fort Oswego, Charwell seen here, through the rigging of HMS Prince Regent on the far left of this picture

History

United Kingdom
- Name: HMS Moira (or Earl of Moira)
- Builder: Kingston Royal Naval Dockyard, Kingston
- Launched: 28 May 1805
- Renamed: Charwell on 22 January 1814
- Reclassified: Re-rigged as brig in 1813; Powder hulk in 1816; Accommodation vessel in 1827
- Fate: Sold in 1837

General characteristics
- Type: 14-gun schooner; later 16-gun brig-sloop
- Tons burthen: 16859/94 (bm)
- Length: 70 ft 6 in (21.5 m) (overall); 56 ft 3 5/8 in (17.2 m) (keel)
- Beam: 23 ft 8 in (7.2 m)
- Draught: 7 ft (2.1 m)
- Propulsion: Sails
- Sail plan: Schooner; later Sloop
- Complement: 86 (in 1830)
- Armament: Launched as 14-guns; Rearmed with 16 guns in 1813: 2 × 9-pounder guns and 14 × 24-pounder carronades; After 1814 1 × 18-pounder and 12 × 24-pounder carronades

HMS Moira (or HMS Earl of Moira) was a British 14-gun schooner of the Royal Navy, that plied the waters of Lake Ontario and the St. Lawrence River during the War of 1812 . Initially constructed for the Provincial Marine in 1805, the vessel took part in the engagements on Lake Ontario. Renamed Charwell in 1814, following the war, the vessel became a powder hulk and an accommodation vessel. The vessel was sold in 1837.

== Description and construction ==
Moira was a schooner that measured 168 59/94 tons burthern with a 70 ft 6 in (21.49 m) length overall and 56 ft 3 5/8 in (17.161 m) at the keel. The vessel had a beam of 23 ft 8 in (7.21 m) and a draught of 7 ft (2.1 m). Initially rigged as a schooner but was re-rigged as a brig in 1813. As a schooner, the vessel was launched with 14 guns. After being re-rigged, the vessel was re-armed with two 9-pounder guns and fourteen 24-pounder carronades. By 1814, the vessel's armament had changed to a single 18-pounder and twelve 24-pounder carronades.

The vessel was constructed at Kingston Royal Naval Dockyard in Kingston, Upper Canada under the supervision of Master Shipwright John Dennis to a design by Alexander Munn and was launched on 28 May 1805 at Point Frederick. Moira was named for the 1st Marquis of Hastings and 2nd Earl of Moira (1754–1826).

== Service history ==
=== As Earl of Moira ===
At the outset of the War of 1812, the Provincial Marine force on Lake Ontario comprised four vessels, making it more powerful than their American foe. Earl of Moira was the second oldest Provincial Marine vessel and a proposal to increase the vessel's armament by lengthening her hull was rejected in early 1812. However, during an inspection of Earl of Moira, extensive rot was found which required significant repairs. By this point, Earl of Moira was armed with only ten 18-pounder carronades. In July 1812, Earl of Moira was commanded by Lieutenant Theophilius Sampson and was part of the squadron that sailed to Sackets Harbor, New York. On 19 July the squadron presented itself off the harbour where the American brig Oneida was stationed. Oneida sailed out, intending to separate the British vessels. However, the squadron drew together and cut off Oneida from Lake Ontario. Oneida reversed course and anchored near the navy yard in Sackets Harbor. There, the American forces prepared themselves for an attack by the British squadron. The Americans fired upon the British squadron and claimed to have hit HMS Royal George "several times". The British broke off the attack and departed.

A few weeks later, Earl of Moira and HMS Duke of Gloucester were sent downriver to capture American merchant vessels at the port of Ogdensburg, New York. The American schooner Julia was sent to intercept the two vessels. On 31 July, Julia found the British vessels off Elizabethtown, Upper Canada. Earl of Moira fired three of her carronades at Julia causing no damage. Musketry from shore drove the American ship closer to the American shore, with the British ships giving chase. Julia retreated to Ogdensburg and anchored with the onset of darkness. The next day Earl of Moira and Duke of Gloucester lay off Ogdensburg. The town prepared itself for an attack but none came. The merchant vessels and Julia remained blockaded at Ogdensburg by the two British ships until a truce was agreed to in August that allowed all the American vessels to sail to Lake Ontario unmolested.

In November, Earl of Moira was escorting the sloop Elizabeth off Wolfe Island when the American schooner Growler happened upon them. Growler captured Elizabeth, ignoring the British schooner and brought the prize into Sackets Harbor. By the end of November, the Provincial Marine was considered a weak link in the defence of Upper Canada and was placed under review. The review found that Earl of Moira had been anchored in Navy Bay and her crew reduced to a few dozen sailors. In January 1813, Earl of Moira's condition was found to be "bad" and a refit was authorized, reducing the vessel's rig from three masts to two and converting the vessel into a brig.

==== Engagements on Lake Ontario ====
The conversion took the rest of the winter and in April 1813, Lieutenant Sampson was ordered to clean up the vessel. Sampson had done so little by the time the inspection of the ship took place, that he was arrested on the spot and confined to quarters until his affairs were put in order and command of the brig was given to Lieutenant George Smith. Once the ship was ready, Earl of Moira was positioned at the opening of Navy Bay at Kingston, keeping a watch for the American squadron. A company of Royal Newfoundland Fencibles was distributed amongst the Lake Ontario squadron, with Earl of Moira's complement rising to fifty-four.

Commodore Sir James Lucas Yeo, who had arrived on 16 May to take command of the Lake Ontario squadron. After his arrival, he reorganized the commands and Earl of Moira passed to Commander Thomas England. Shortly after assuming command, England became sick and was invalided home and Lieutenant Alexander Dobbs was made acting-commander. In May 1813, word arrived from Fort George that the American squadron had left their anchorage and sailed south. A council of war was organized and a force under the command of Colonel Edward Baynes would be landed at Sackets Harbor by Yeo's force. Earl of Moira was among the vessels that participated in transporting the troops to the Second Battle of Sacket's Harbor. Earl of Moira did not participate further in the battle beyond transporting troops. In June, the squadron carried elements of the 8th Foot to Burlington Heights. While passing a large encampment on 7 June, the squadron became aware that it was American. Yeo had Beresford towed within range to bombard the camp. Earl of Moira, HMS Wolfe and Sir Sidney Smith sailed on to Forty Mile Creek to disembark the troops. Departing the area on 11 June the squadron searched for the American fleet but did not find them and had to settle for capturing three schooners and two sloops, burned a raft and raided storehouses along the Gensee River and American Eighteen Mile Creek. The squadron returned to Kingston on 17 June.

On 31 July, the squadron departed Kingston in search of the Americans. A week later on 7 August the two fleets came together in Lake Ontario off the Niagara River. Nothing came of the encounter, but three days later, the Americans sought battle only for their tactical advantage to change in favour of the British. Yeo's squadron closed with the Americans and captured two schooners, Julia and Growler. In September, the two squadrons fought again, with the British retreating, returning to Kingston on 16 September.

In order to make his ships more capable, Yeo ordered the reorganization of guns in his fleet. Earl of Moira had two carronades removed to open up space on her deck. The squadron sailed again onto Lake Ontario and encountered the Americans on 28 September in Burlington Bay. Earl of Moira was fourth in the line of battle and engaged the American ships Madison, Oneida and Governor Tompkins. The British squadron retreated after the flagship, Wolfe became heavily damaged and returned to Kingston on 7 October.

In October, Earl of Moira was among the flotilla sent to support operations against American ground forces at French Creek. Earl of Moira was one of the vessels anchored in a line across the bay which opened fire on the American columns. The Americans returned fire and traded shots with the British until darkness fell. The next morning, the British began their bombardment again but were driven off by the intense American fire, suffering one killed and five injured. Earl of Moira saw no further action until being laid up when winter came.

=== As Charwell ===
She was renamed Charwell on 22 January 1814. On 1 May, the squadron was reorganized. Charwell continued to be captained by Alexander Dobbs, now of the rank of commander. On 4 May 1814, Charwell was part of Commodore Sir James Lucas Yeo's squadron, embarking 400 soldiers to attack the American fort at Fort Oswego.

During the assault Charwell and HMS Star escorted the bateaux filled with troops towards the landing near the fort's glacis, firing on American positions as they closed. The British captured the fort and the seized goods were brought back to the warships lying offshore. The squadron returned to Kingston on 8 May. Yeo then ordered a blockade of Sackets Harbor, with the smaller vessels of the squadron ferrying troops or patrolling for American shipping. After the British defeat at Sandy Creek on 29 May, Yeo lifted the blockade on 5 June and sailed for the Bay of Quinte. A shuffle of commands took place with Commander Dobbs leaving Charwell to command Star and was replaced by Lieutenant Henry Spence.

In July, under the command of Alexander Dobbs, Charwell, with Star, HMS Magnet and HMS Netley and Vincent had sailed to the Niagara River to provide transportation for British ground forces in the area. In August, American ships arrived to blockade them within the river. The British ships remained penned in by the American blockade for nearly two months.

Unable to leave, Dobbs took men from his vessels and marched down to Fort Erie, where the British had besieged the American fort. There, on 12 August men from Charwell (A.F. Spence), Magnet (Edward Collier), Netley (Lieutenant Charles Radcliffe), and Star (Alexander Dobbs), captured two American schooners, Somers and Ohio. (Note: A first-class share of the head money paid in January 1819 was worth £13 6s 5¼d; a sixth-class share, that of an ordinary seaman, was worth 4s 0½d.) In October, the rest of the squadron sailed for the Niagara peninsula, carrying reinforcements for the British Army with them. The American blockade lifted and the trapped vessels sailed out to rejoin the squadron, transferring the soldiers to shore from the larger ships. Following the American withdrawal from Fort Erie, the squadron returned to Kingston on 10 November. The war ended on 24 December 1814, but word only reached North America in 1815.

After the end of the war Charwell became a powder hulk from 1816 and an accommodation vessel in 1827. Charwell was sold in 1837.
