= Peter Margetson Wallace =

British Army general

General Peter Margetson Wallace
- Born: 19 September 1780; Arnold, Nottinghamshire
- Died: 14 December 1864 (aged 84); Pimlico, Westminster
- Burial place: Cheltenham New Burial Ground; LAT 51.9035784 LONG 2.0849378
- Spouse: Louisa Turmaine
- Military career
- Allegiance: United Kingdom
- Branch: British Army
- Service years: 1797–1864
- Rank: General
- Unit: Royal Artillery
- Conflicts: Walcheren Campaign; Second Battle of Sacket's Harbor

Peter Margetson Wallace (1780–1864) was a career soldier in the British Army who rose to be Colonel-Commandant of the Royal Artillery and a full General.

== Early life ==
Born in Nottinghamshire, Peter Margetson Wallace was the second son of Peter Wallace and his wife Sarah, daughter of Thomas Stoakes Harris, owner of a sugar estate in Jamaica. Leaving him with relations, his parents went back to Jamaica, where his father and elder brother died. His mother returned to England and in 1785 had Peter baptised at the age of 5 into the Church of England at St Marylebone Parish Church.

== Military career ==
In 1797 at the age of 16, Peter became a Second Lieutenant in the Royal Artillery, an appointment into an élite corps which suggests not just ability but also influence. Sent to the West Indies, he was aboard a merchant ship in December 1800 that fought a French privateer off Barbados. A posting to Canada followed and then in 1809 he served in the Walcheren Campaign, fighting at the siege of Flushing. In 1813, by then a captain, he was back in Canada, where he commanded the British artillery at the Second Battle of Sacket's Harbor. At the end of the war, he was a Major and remained in service. From 1838 to 1841, when he became a Colonel, he was based in Malta. In 1853 he was made Colonel-Commandant of the Royal Artillery, followed by promotions to Major-General in 1854, Lieutenant-General also in 1854 and full General in 1863.

== Finances ==
In 1810 he was owner of a family plantation in Jamaica called Stoakesfield, which then had 64 slaves and seven head of livestock. This estate he disposed of, part of the deal being payment of an income to his wife of 130 pounds a year for life (worth over 7,500 pounds in 2014) out of the Taylor's Caymanas estate. When the 286 slaves there were emancipated in 1837, he claimed compensation of 2514 pounds from the British government (about 205,000 pounds in 2014) but was unsuccessful.

== Family ==
About 1801 he formed a relationship with a young woman from Canterbury, Kent called Louisa Turmaine and the pair were together in Canada in 1802 when their first child Louisa was born. Two sons followed, William in 1804 at Canterbury and Thomas in 1806 at Chatham, Kent. In 1809, Peter aged 28 and Louisa aged about 34 were married at St Marylebone Parish Church and then had two legitimate children in Canada, George in 1809 and Julia in 1815. All three sons became Army officers and both daughters married Army officers, Louisa's husband being William Mein Smith.

After returning from Malta in 1842, he made his home on the Isle of Man, where his wife died in 1847. Eventually he lived on his own in Pimlico, where he died in 1864 of prostate disease, leaving assets for probate purposes of under 600 pounds (about 53,000 pounds in 2014). He was buried at Cheltenham and his memorial is in Cheltenham Minster, St Mary's.
