= Governor Simcoe (1793 ship) =

Merchant schooner launched in 1793 and British naval vessel

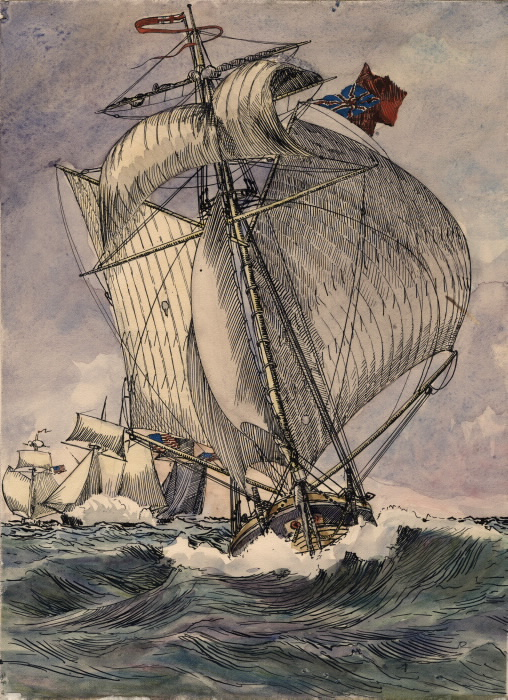
- The North West Company schooner Governor Simcoe was pursued by an American squadron while trying to enter Kingston harbour.

History

Great Britain
- Name: Governor Simcoe
- Namesake: John Graves Simcoe, first lieutenant governor of Upper Canada.
- Builder: Richard Cartwright
- Launched: Kingston, 29 October 1793
- Fate: Sold to Provincial Marine, March 1813
- Notes: Merchant schooner

United Kingdom
- Renamed: Sir Sydney Smith
- Acquired: March 1813
- Fate: Sold to Royal Navy, 1814

United Kingdom
- Renamed: HMS Magnet 11 January 1814
- Acquired: 1814
- Fate: Blown up 5 August 1814

General characteristics
- Tons burthen: 137 (bm)
- Length: 74 ft (22.6 m) (deck)
- Beam: 18 ft 6 in (5.6 m)
- Sail plan: Schooner and later brig
- Complement: 75–80 + 29 marines
- Armament: Sir Sydney Smith: 2 × 12-pounder long guns; 10 × 32-pounder carronades; HMS Magnet; 10 × 24-pounder carronades; 1 × 9-pounder long gun

Governor Simcoe was a merchant schooner launched in 1793. The Provincial Marine acquired her in 1813 and renamed her after the British naval officer Sir Sidney Smith. She saw service on Lake Ontario during the War of 1812. The Royal Navy acquired her in 1814 and renamed her HMS Magnet. A few months later her captain had to blow her up to prevent the Americans from capturing the vessel.

== Description ==
The vessel was constructed with the sail plan of a schooner for service on the Great Lakes. The schooner measured 137 tons burthen and was 74 ft (22.6 m) long at the gundeck and had a beam of 18 ft 6 in (5.6 m). When in service with the Provincial Marine as Sir Sydney Smith, the vessel was armed with two 12-pounder (5 kg) long guns and ten 32-pounder (15 kg) carronades. After conversion to the brig HMS Magnet, the vessel was armed with ten 24-pounder (11 kg) carronades and one 9-pounder (4 kg) long gun. The vessel had a complement of 75–80 sailors and 29 Royal Marines.

== Service history ==
=== Governor Simcoe ===
Governor Simcoe served the North West Company (NWC) fur trade on Lake Ontario from her launch at Kingston, Upper Canada, on 29 October 1793. She was built for a group of merchants with ties to the North West Company, principally Richard Cartwright. As was common for most NWC ships at the start of the war, she was then likely hired out as a supply ship for the Provincial Marine and remained unarmed until a survey and refit in March 1813.

For some years prior to the outbreak of war, and for at least the first five months of the war, her captain was James Richardson (1759–1832), an ex-Provincial Marine officer. "On the eve of the Battle of Queenston Heights on 13 October 1812 he delivered a shipment of gunpowder to Niagara and afterwards returned to York with prisoners and the news of Major-General Sir Isaac Brock's death."

On her last merchant voyage, on 11 November 1812 Commodore Isaac Chauncey's United States Navy (USN) Lake Ontario squadron then patrolling off Kingston spotted Governor Simcoe and chased her. Governor Simcoe "evaded capture but ran too closely over a shoal and sank at its berth in Kingston from the damage it had incurred."

=== Sir Sydney Smith ===
Early in 1813, despite Governor Simcoe being the oldest vessel on the lakes at the time, the British acquired her (whether by purchase or hire). The vessel had been raised from where she had sunk in Kingston harbour. After a survey and extensive refitting in March 1813 she was renamed Sir Sydney Smith (alternatively spelled Sir Sidney Smith). Sir Sydney Smith was not a commissioned warship of the Royal Navy and so was not entitled to the prefix 'HMS'. The vessel was under the command of Lieutenant G. Marjoribanks. Upon Sir James Lucas Yeo's arrival to take command of the British Great Lakes squadron, Lieutenant Charles Radcliffe was given command of Sir Sydney Smith.

She set sail on 27 May 1813 with the rest of Commodore Yeo's Lake Ontario squadron. As Sir Sydney Smith she took part in attacks on Sackets Harbor and Oswego, as well as engagements against the United States Navy on 10–11 August and 11 September 1813. The squadron returned to Kingston on 16 September where Sydney Smith underwent a refit. The vessel was brought alongside HMS Wolfe and using the latter's mainyard as a hoist, Sydney Smith's lower masts were lifted out and re-stepped in order to reduce the weight of the top hamper, making the vessel more stable. On 28 September the two squadrons came together in Burlington Bay. The flagship of the British squadron, Wolfe, was crippled and the British retreated back to their anchorage. The squadron returned to Kingston on 7 October and for the rest of the month, the vessels remained near Kingston. On 1 November, Sydney Smith was among the vessels sent to harass the American forces gathering at French Creek, New York. Along with Lord Melville and Earl of Moira, Sydney Smith bombarded the American camp there, trading fire with shore-based artillery. The British ships were shot up and withdrew on 2 November, having suffered one man killed and five injured. Sydney Smith and Beresford were then detailed with bringing elements of the 89th Foot and 49th Foot infantry regiments to Prescott, Ontario, with those units taking part in the Battle of Crysler's Farm on 11 November. Following the battle, the vessels returned to Kingston on 12 November. Upon Commander Edward Collier's arrival at Kingston on 22 March 1814, he was given command of Sir Sydney Smith.

=== HMS Magnet ===
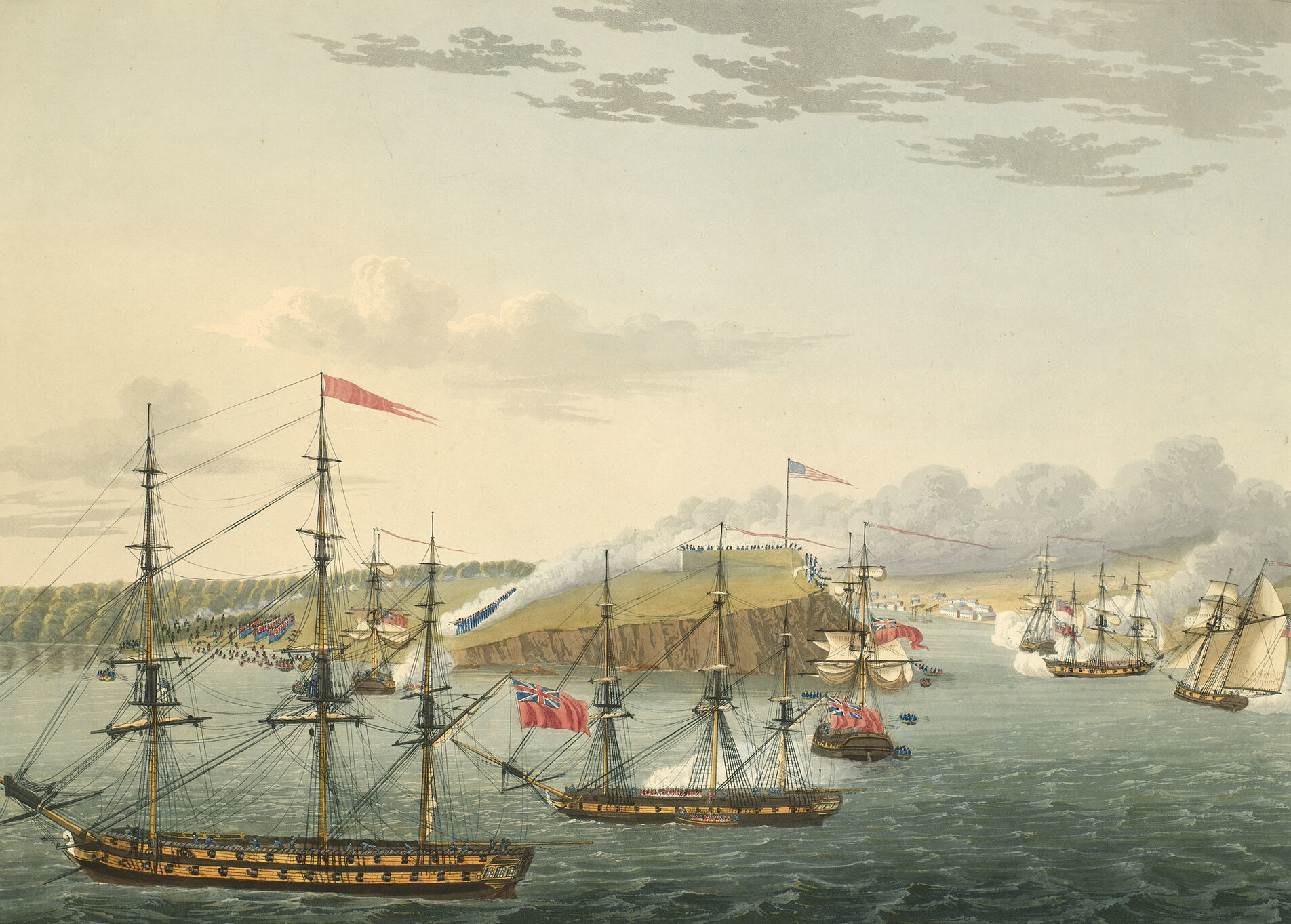
The attack on Fort Oswego, Magnet is the ship on the far right of the picture

The Royal Navy took command of all Provincial Marine vessels in 1814, renamed them, and replaced their crews with Royal Navy crews. Sir Sydney Smith was refitted as a brig and renamed HMS Magnet, the Admiralty not liking to name vessels after living people. The vessel, rated a sloop, remained under the command of Commander Collier. On 4 May 1814, Magnet was among the squadron of British ships that sailed from Kingston with infantry embarked to attack Fort Oswego. During the battle, Commander Collier was given command of the gunboats and earned a mention in dispatches for his efforts. The soldiers aboard Magnet were kept in reserve, only going ashore once the battle had been won. The squadron then began a blockade of Sackett's Harbor, New York, the main US naval base on Lake Ontario on 11 May, lifting it on 5 June. Upon the return to Kingston, Commander Collier took command of Princess Charlotte and Lieutenant George Hawkesworth was given command of Magnet.

In July, Magnet was one of five vessels that had taken up moorings in the Niagara River to provide quick transportation for General Gordon Drummond's army from York to Niagara. On 5 August 1814 she was carrying munitions from York to Niagara when Chauncey's squadron arrived to block access to Magnet's safe anchorage on the Niagara River. Fearing capture, Hawkesworth drove Magnet ashore 10 miles (16 km) west of the mouth of the Niagara River, salvaged what munitions he could, and then set a fuse to destroy Magnet and the remaining cargo in an enormous explosion which observers said could be heard and felt at York—approximately 30 miles (48 km) across Lake Ontario.
