= HMS Duke of Gloucester (1807) =

Brig of the Royal Navy

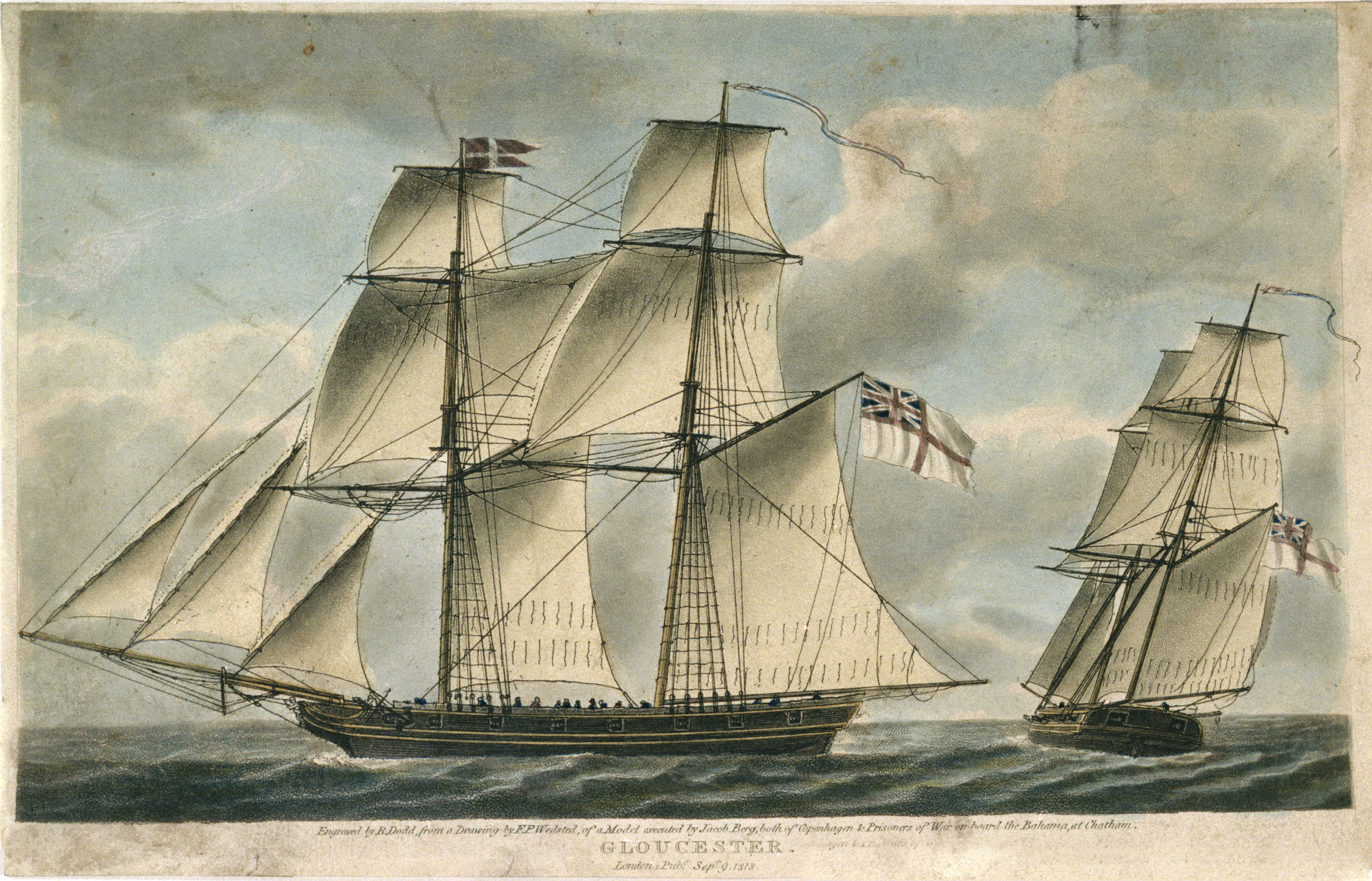
- Gloucester in 1813, drawn from a model

History

United Kingdom
- Name: Duke of Gloucester
- Builder: Kingston Royal Naval Dockyard, Kingston
- Launched: May 1807
- Fate: Captured on 25 April 1813

United States
- Name: York
- Acquired: Captured 25 April 1813
- In service: 25 April 1813
- Out of service: 29 May 1813
- Fate: Burned by the British on 29 May 1813
- Notes: Used as powder hulk

General characteristics
- Type: 10-gun brig
- Tons burthen: 165 (bm)
- Propulsion: Sails
- Sail plan: brig
- Armament: 10 × 12-pounder guns

HMS Duke of Gloucester (or Gloucester) was a 10-gun brig of the Royal Navy which was launched at the Kingston Royal Naval Dockyard in Kingston, Ontario. A Provincial Marine vessel, during the War of 1812, the brig took part in several of the early engagements between British and American naval forces on Lake Ontario and the St. Lawrence River. While being repaired at York, Duke of Gloucester was captured by Americans in 1813. A month later the British destroyed the brig at the Battle of Sackett's Harbor.

== Description and construction ==
In 1806, plans were drawn up for a vessel to replace the aging Provincial Marine gunboat Swift. The new vessel was constructed at Kingston Royal Naval Dockyard in Kingston, Upper Canada under Master Shipwright John Dennis. When Duke of Gloucester was launched in May 1807, the Provincial Marine's role on the Great Lakes and St. Lawrence River was restricted to the transport of provisions and personnel for the colonial government and the British Army. The vessel measured 165 tons burthen and Duke of Gloucester's draught was shallow enough to allow the brig access to any port in any season. The vessel was armed with ten 12-pounder (5.4 kg) guns. By the War of 1812, the vessel was armed with six 6-pounder (2.7 kg) long guns and rated a schooner.

== Service history ==
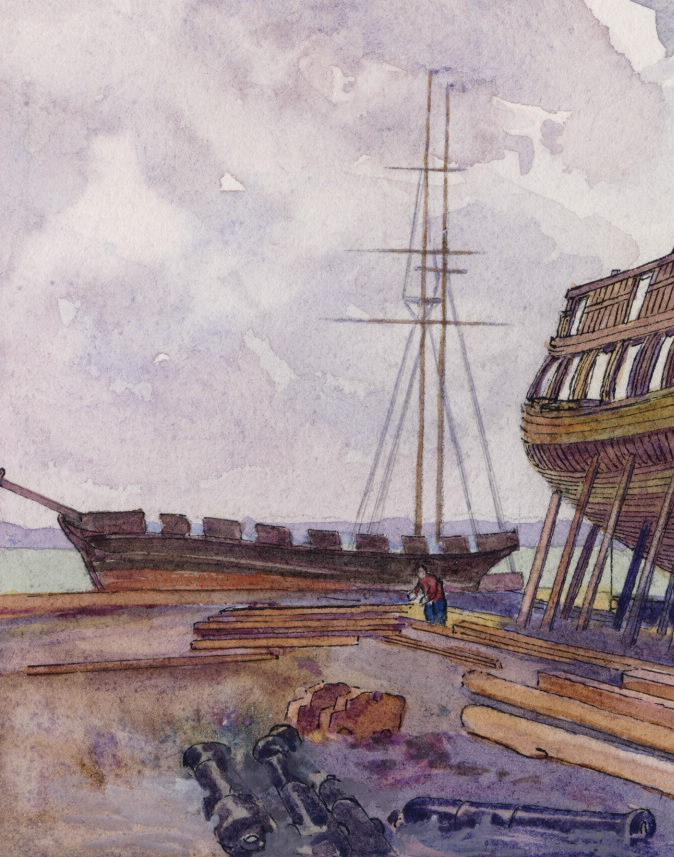
The dismantled hull of Duke of Gloucester in early 1813 before her capture by the Americans, directly behind her are the masts of Prince Regent, at York, Upper Canada

After entering service, Duke of Gloucester was retained for exclusive use by the colonial government. By 1812, the hull had rotted and a replacement, Prince Regent, was ordered. At the onset of the war, Duke of Gloucester was commanded by Lieutenant Francis Gauvreau. Duke of Gloucester was part of the squadron under the command of Master Commandant Hugh Earl that sailed to attack Sackett's Harbor on 19 July 1812. While the three larger vessels in the squadron, Royal George, Earl of Moira and Prince Regent attacked the American fortifications, Duke of Gloucester remained offshore. The attack failed and the British withdrew.

Duke of Gloucester and Earl of Moira were then ordered to capture a group of American merchant vessels sheltering at Ogdensburg, New York. Commodore Isaac Chauncey sent the schooner Julia to intercept the British vessels and the two forces met off Elizabethtown, Upper Canada on 31 July. Earl of Moira fired and missed Julia, but the strength of musket fire coming from the British shoreline forced the Americans to retreat to Ogdensburg. The following day, Earl of Moira and Duke of Gloucester began a naval blockade of Ogdensburg. The blockade was in effect until the end of the month when a temporary halt to the conflict allowed Julia and the merchant vessels to sail for Lake Ontario. For the rest of the year the squadron, with the exception of Royal George, performed the traditional duties of the Provincial Marine, transporting supplies along Lake Ontario.

During the winter of 1812–1813, Duke of Gloucester was sent to York, Upper Canada. However, by 1813, Duke of Gloucester was no longer seaworthy and was un-rigged. Duke of Gloucester was being repaired at York, with the intent of increasing the vessel's armament to 16 guns when the Americans briefly captured the colonial capital in 1813. Chauncey stripped the town of guns and supplies and towed the schooner back to Sackett's Harbor, New York. Renamed York, the schooner was converted to a powder hulk at Sackett's Harbor. York was herself damaged by the British a month later on 29 May 1813 in the Battle of Sackett's Harbor.

== Sources ==
- Bamford, Don (2007). Freshwater Heritage: A History of Sail on the Great Lakes, 1670–1918. Toronto: Natural Heritage Books [Dundurn Group]. ISBN 978-1-897045-20-6.
- Colledge, J. J.; Warlow, Ben (2006) [1969]. Ships of the Royal Navy: The Complete Record of All Fighting Ships of the Royal Navy from the 15th Century to the Present (3rd Rev ed.). London: Chatham Publishing. ISBN 978-1-86176-281-8. OCLC 67375475.
- Dudley, William S., ed. (1992). The Naval War of 1812: A Documentary History. Vol. II. Washington D.C.: Department of the Navy. ISBN 0-945274-06-8.
- Lardas, Mark (2012). Great Lakes Warships 1812–1815. Oxford, UK: Osprey Publishing. ISBN 978-1-84908-566-3.
- Malcomson, Robert (2001). Warships of the Great Lakes 1754–1834. London: Chatham Publishing. ISBN 1-8617-6115-5.
- Malcomson, Robert (2001) [1998]. Lords of the Lake: The Naval War on Lake Ontario 1812–1814 (Paperback ed.). Toronto: Robin Brass Studio. ISBN 1-896941-24-9.
