= List of War of 1812 Bicentennial =

List of commemorations and organizations

The War of 1812 Bicentennial were a series of events to commemorate the War of 1812 in Canada and the United States during the war's bicentenary, 2012–2015. Included here is a list of planned commemorations and organizations.

== Canada ==
The Canadian Government marked the bicentennial as a national event.

- Canadian Heritage

=== Ontario ===
- Niagara 1812 Legacy Council
- Ontario Historical Society

=== New Brunswick ===
- New Brunswick Provincial Committee for Commemorations of War of 1812

== United States ==
The U.S. government has had no formal organization or committee to coordinate commemorations of the War of 1812; the War of 1812 Bicentennial Commission Act failed to pass Congress in 2006.

=== U.S. military commemorations ===
- U.S. Navy Commemoration of the Bicentennial of the War of 1812 and the Star-Spangled Banner
- Naval History and Heritage Command
- Preserve the Pensions! (A project to digitize all of the War of 1812 pension files by the end of the war's bicentennial)

=== Illinois ===
- Illinois War of 1812 Bicentennial Commission
- Illinois War of 1812 Society

=== Indiana ===
- Vincennes War of 1812 Bicentennial Commission

=== Iowa ===
- Planned commemorations at the old Fort Madison site.

=== Kentucky ===
- Kentucky War of 1812 Bicentennial Commission

=== Louisiana ===
- Commemoration of the 200th anniversary of the Battle of New Orleans (January 8, 2015)

=== Maryland ===
- Maryland War of 1812 Bicentennial Commission
- Maryland's Star Spangled 200 Celebration

=== Michigan ===
- The Michigan Commission on the Commemoration of the Bicentennial of the War of 1812

=== New York ===
In 2011, New York state Gov. Andrew Cuomo vetoed a bill to establish a formal War Of 1812 Bicentennial Commission. Previous versions of the bill were vetoed repeatedly by Gov. David Paterson in 2009 and 2010.

=== North Carolina ===
- North Carolina War of 1812 Bicentennial

=== Ohio ===
- Ohio War of 1812 Bicentennial Commission

=== Virginia ===
- James Madison Center War of 1812 Bicentennial
- Virginia Bicentennial of the War of 1812 Commission

=== Washington, D.C. ===
- Washington DC War of 1812 Bicentennial Commission "Building Heritage Bridges"
