= USS Fair American =

History

United States
- Name: USS Fair American
- Builder: Jacob Townsend
- Acquired: October 1812
- Fate: Sold 15 May 1815 back to original owner Jacob Townsend

General characteristics
- Displacement: 82 tons
- Propulsion: Sail
- Complement: 52
- Armament: 1 × 32-pounder, 1 × 12-pounder

USS Fair American was a United States Navy schooner which served in the War of 1812, taking part in several engagements on Lake Ontario.

The vessel was bought in October 1812 at Oswego, New York, from Jacob Townsend, and was based along with the rest of her squadron at Sackets Harbor, New York, during the winter of 1812–1813 under the command of Lieutenant Isaac Chauncey, after which she supported land operations around Lake Ontario, including the landing of General Henry Dearborn's force of 1,700 troops resulting in the capture of York (now Toronto) on 27 April 1813.

In 1814, the ship was converted into a transport and used to ferry supplies and troops. With the conclusion of the war, the ship was sold at Sacketts Harbor on 16 May 1815.

== Bibliography ==
- Cooper, James Fenimore (1856). History of the navy of the United States of America.
  Stringer & Townsend, New York. p. 508. OCLC 197401914. Url
- Dept U.S.Navy. "Fair American". Dictionary of American Naval Fighting Ships.
  DEPARTMENT OF THE NAVY -- NAVAL HISTORICAL CENTER. Archived from the original on March 14, 2004.
