= USS Raven (1813) =

Transport and supply ship

History

United States
- Name: USS Raven
- Namesake: Raven
- Acquired: 6 February 1813
- Fate: Sold 15 May 1815
- Notes: Previously the merchant ship Mary

General characteristics
- Type: Schooner
- Tonnage: 50 tons
- Propulsion: Sail
- Sail plan: Schooner-rigged
- Armament: 1 x mortar

USS Raven was a transport and supply ship that served in the United States Navy from 1813 to 1815.

Raven was serving as the merchant schooner Mary on Lake Ontario when the U.S. Navy purchased her on 6 February 1813 for use in the War of 1812. Renamed Raven, she was fitted out as a bomb vessel, but instead served as a transport and supply ship during the war.

Raven was sold at Sackets Harbor, New York, on 15 May 1815.
