= USS Madison (1812) =

Sloops-of-war of the United States Navy

History

United States
- Name: Madison
- Namesake: President James Madison
- Builder: Sackets Harbor yard of Henry Eckford
- Launched: 26 November 1812
- Decommissioned: ca. 1815
- Fate: Sold 1825

General characteristics
- Type: Corvette
- Displacement: 503 tons
- Length: 112 ft 0 in (34.14 m)
- Beam: 32 ft 6 in (9.91 m)
- Sail plan: schooner-rigged
- Complement: 200 officers and enlisted men
- Armament: 14 × long 18–pounder guns; 8 × 32-pounder carronades

USS Madison was a U.S. Navy corvette (or sloop) built during the War of 1812 for use on the Great Lakes. She was named for James Madison, a Founding Father and the nation's president at the time.

USS Madison was built at Sackets Harbor, New York by Henry Eckford. She was launched on Lake Ontario on 26 November 1812, Lieutenant Jesse D. Elliot in command. She was the first U.S. corvette launched on the lake.

Madison departed Sackets Harbor on 25 April 1813 as flagship of Commodore Isaac Chauncey. She saw active duty in the War of 1812 as part of Chauncey's Lake Ontario Squadron. Madison participated in the capture of York, now Toronto, Ontario, Canada, in April 1813; the attacks on Fort George in May 1813; and engagements with British squadrons on Lake Ontario from 7–11 August 1813, and from 11–22 September 1813.

After the end of the war, Madison, a fast ship-rigged vessel that was not considered very safe to operate, was laid up at Sackets Harbor until sold in 1825.
