= Prince Regent (1812 schooner) =

History

United Kingdom
- Name: Prince Regent
- Builder: John Dennis, York, Upper Canada
- Launched: 1812
- Renamed: 1813: General Beresford or Lord Beresford (Beresford); 1814: Netley
- Fate: Broken up for scrap 1830s

General characteristics as built
- Tons burthen: 14267/94 (bm)
- Length: 72 ft 6 in (22.1 m) gun deck; 59 ft 10 1/2 in (18.2 m) wl
- Beam: 21 ft 2 in (6.5 m)
- Draught: 9 ft 4 in (2.8 m)
- Depth of hold: 7 ft 3 in (2.2 m)
- Sail plan: Schooner-rigged
- Armament: 10 × 12-pounder (5.4 kg) carronades; 2 × 6-pounder (2.7 kg) long guns

Prince Regent was a schooner constructed for Upper Canada's Provincial Marine for use on Lake Ontario. Built just before the beginning of the War of 1812, the vessel took part in the attack on Sackett's Harbor, New York. With the arrival of the Royal Navy in the Great Lakes under the command of Commodore James Lucas Yeo in 1813, the vessel was renamed HMS Lord Beresford or General Beresford, or Beresford. The British detachment on the lake engaged the American naval squadron and attacked American positions in the Niagara region, while supporting British armies.

In 1814, the British detachment on Lake Ontario was re-organised and Beresford was re-rigged as a brig and renamed HMS Netley. Sent to support British troop movements in southern Upper Canada, Netley was blockaded in the Niagara River with five other British vessels. During this time, members of the vessel's crew took part in the Siege of Fort Erie, participating in the capture of two American schooners. During the operation, Netley's commanding officer was killed. Following the end of the war, Netley was laid up at Kingston, Upper Canada and was sold in the 1830s to be broken up.

== Design and description ==
Prince Regent was designed by the shipwright John Dennis as a standard topsail schooner for use by the Provincial Marine on the Great Lakes. As built, the vessel was pierced for ten guns and was 72 feet 6 inches (22.1 m) long at the gun deck and 59 feet 10 1/2 inches (18.2 m) at the waterline. The schooner had a beam of 21 feet 2 inches (6.5 m) and a depth of hold of 7 feet 3 inches (2.2 m). Prince Regent measured 142 67/94 tons burthen. The schooner had a maximum draught of 9 feet 4 inches (2.8 m) when fully loaded. During the War of 1812, Prince Regent carried a variety of armament. In 1812, the vessel was armed with ten 12-pounder (5.4 kg) carronades and two 6-pounder (2.7 kg) long guns. In 1813, the armament was increased to ten 18-pounder (8.2 kg) carronades and two 9-pounder (4.1 kg) long guns. The following year, the 18-pounder carronades were reduced to eight; one 24-pounder (11 kg) long gun situated on a pivot mount replaced them.

== Career ==
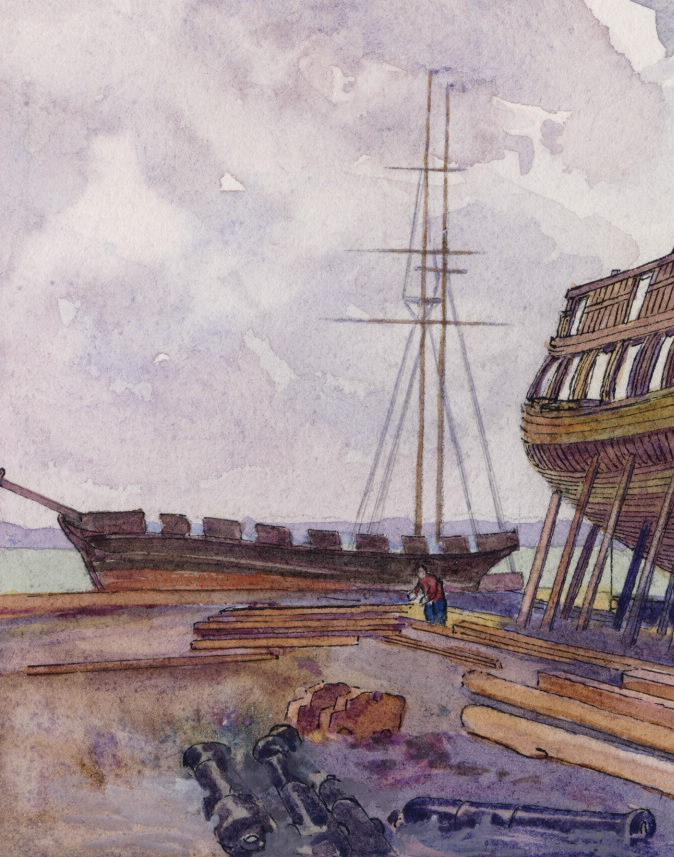
The masts of Prince Regent in 1813, directly behind the dismantled hull of Duke of Gloucester at York, Upper Canada

=== As Prince Regent ===
Constructed by John Dennis at York, Upper Canada, the vessel was launched in mid 1812 as Prince Regent. (Note: Malcomson has Prince Regent launched in July, while Lardas states June, with the schooner entering service in July.) Considered "a fine despatch boat", Prince Regent was part of the Provincial Marine squadron of Upper Canada based at Kingston for service on Lake Ontario. Lieutenant William Fish of the Provincial Marine was the vessel's first commanding officer.

With the onset of the War of 1812, the Provincial Marine were under the command of Commodore Hugh Earle. He made plans for a raid on the American naval base at Sackett's Harbor, New York. On 19 July 1812, the Provincial Marine of Lake Ontario departed Kingston for Sackett's Harbor. Composed of Royal George, Prince Regent, Earl of Moira, Duke of Gloucester, Governor Simcoe and Seneca, the squadron was met by USS Oneida which attempted to escape, then split one or two of the smaller ships off from the British squadron before returning to Sackett's Harbor. To prevent either of Oneida's actions, the squadron came together and manoeuvered to prevent the American ship from escaping. However, while doing so, the wind died and the British approach on Sackett's Harbor slowed allowing the American defences to prepared. The British attack performed by Royal George, Prince Regent, and Earl of Moira was short lived in the face of stiff American resistance and they soon retreated to Kingston with only Royal George having received significant damage.

Prince Regent saw little further action for the rest of the year and was sent to York for winter layup. During the layup, guns were taken from Prince Regent to arm the vessel under construction at York, Sir Isaac Brock. With the winter layup ended, Prince Regent was sent to patrol Kingston Channel. This proved fortuitous as the Americans, learning of the construction of Sir Isaac Brock and Prince Regent's layup at York, chose to attack the town on 27 April 1813. They burned Sir Isaac Brock on the stocks and captured Duke of Gloucester, but missed Prince Regent.

=== As Beresford ===
In May 1813, Commodore James Lucas Yeo arrived at Kingston to take command of Lake Ontario squadron. Now under Royal Navy control, the vessels were renamed and given the prefix HMS. Prince Regent was renamed Lord Beresford or Beresford and command was given to Commander Francis Spilsbury.

Following the American assault on York, the British began planning retaliatory attacks in US territory while also alleviating pressure on the British Army further south in Upper Canada. On 26 May, the squadron sailed from Kingston with 800 troops embarked from the 1st, 8th, 100th and 104th Regiments of Foot, the Glengarry Light Infantry and the Voltigeurs and parties of Mississauga and Mohawk warriors. Small bateaux, gunboats and the merchant vessel Lady Murray (which was carrying the artillery pieces) followed the squadron. They arrived later that day at Sackett's Harbor, too late for an attack. They attempted to make a landing the following day, but it was aborted. Finally, the British landed on 29 May and due to a lack of wind, only Beresford was able to support the attack, having been rowed into position to attack Fort Tompkins. As the vessel came into range, two American schooners began firing at Beresford as they fled up the Black River. The attack was called off once the American shipyard was set afire and the British retreated to Kingston.

For most of June and July the American squadron remained at Sackett's Harbor while they awaited newly constructed ships to augment their force and the British had unimpeded access to Lake Ontario. Yeo's squadron supported British forces and harassed American supply lines. On 3 June, the squadron set forth to transport elements of the 8th Foot to General John Vincent at Burlington Heights. On 8 June, as the squadron neared Forty Mile Creek, a large American encampment was spotted. Beresford was towed into range of the beach and bombarded the American positions. Backed up by Royal George, Beresford suffered return fire from the Americans, but General Morgan Lewis was forced to abandon the camp under pressure from both Yeo's squadron and British land forces.

On 31 July, Yeo's squadron sailed from Kingston with the intent to engage the Americans. On 7 August, the two forces came close to fighting, with USS General Pike firing upon and missing the British vessels. On 10 August, the British squadron caught the American squadron and captured the schooners USS Julia and USS Growler. Yeo's force anchored near York to repair the prizes and Wolfe's topmasts. The squadron returned to Kingston on 19 August. They departed four days later to escort a convoy of three transports carrying supplies and reinforcements for General Francis de Rottenburg's army.

On 11 September, the two squadrons engaged northwest of the Genesee River in Braddock Bay. General Pike began the fight during which the British became becalmed. The British retreated and returned to Kingston in mid-September. In order to increase the long range firepower of the squadron and counter the American's superiority in that area, Yeo had a 24-pounder gun mounted on a circle installed in Beresford with two 9-pounder guns and two carronades removed to compensate for the added weight. The squadron left Kingston on 19 September and in Burlington Bay, the two squadrons met on 28 September. General Pike got the upper hand on Yeo's flagship Wolfe and as Wolfe sought to move away, General Pike nearly caught Lord Melville and Beresford as they attempted to follow Wolfe. The American squadron chased the British squadron deeper into the bay. However, the British escaped and Lord Melville and Beresford patrolled outward of the squadron to protect the damaged Wolfe and Prince George. The British squadron returned to Kingston following the battle.

On 30 October, Beresford and Sir Sidney Smith (the renamed Governor Simcoe) were sent to the northeast end of Wolfe Island and were later joined by Earl of Moira, Lord Melville and four gunboats on 1 November. The force was sent to French Creek where they were ordered to attack the American camp. Due to the narrowness of the bay, Beresford and the gunboats were held in reserve. However, fire from the shore drove the British ships off. An observation corps formed at Kingston by General George Prevost in response to the American invasion of eastern Upper Canada were put aboard Beresford and Sir Sidney Smith and they sailed with gunboats and bateaux on 6 November to follow the Americans. By the time the force arrived at Cornwall, the Americans had retreated to New York. Beresford and Sir Sidney Smith returned to Kingston on 7 November. Beresford was then sent to patrol the Bay of Quinte and carry supplies for the army.

=== As Netley ===
The vessel was laid up for winter and converted to a brig. In April 1814, Beresford returned to service and was sent to Niagara to deliver elements of the 103rd Foot and supplies. In January 1814, the Royal Navy decided to reorganise the British Lake Ontario detachment along the lines of a standard British squadron. As part of the process, each of the ships would need to be renamed. On 1 May 1814, Commodore Yeo reorganised his command and Beresford was renamed Netley with Lieutenant Charles Radcliffe taking command of the vessel. On 4 May the squadron departed Kingston with 550 soldiers on board and sailed for Fort Oswego, New York. Netley departed the squadron en route and sailed for Niagara and did not take part in the attack. Following the battle, Yeo set up a blockade of Sackett's Harbor. During May the smaller vessels of the squadron were used to transport troops to Burlington and Niagara and for patrol duties. However, following the disaster at the Battle of Big Sandy Creek, where Captain Stephen Popham had led elements of Yeo's squadron into an ambush and decimated the ranks of the detachment with the majority being captured including Netley's former commander Francis Spilbury. Yeo was forced to lift his blockade and re-crew the larger vessels with personnel from Netley and Magnet (the renamed Sir Sidney Smith). The under-crewed Netley was no longer capable of fighting and was used as a transport and the squadron returned to Kingston on 13 June.

On 15 June, the squadron departed Kingston with elements of the 103rd Foot, Royal Artillery, 100th Foot and supplies for the forces on the Niagara Peninsula. They returned on 24 June. Netley was used to keep in contact with advanced elements on the peninsula. Under the command of Commander Alexander Dobbs, Star (the renamed Lord Melville), Charwell (the renamed Earl of Moira), Netley, Magnet and Vincent moored in the Niagara River in July to allow the quick transportation of troops and supplies from York to Niagara for General Gordon Drummond's army. With the exception of Magnet which had been destroyed, all of the ships of Dobbs' command were blockaded in the Niagara River for two months by the American squadron beginning in August.

With the vessels unable to move, Dobbs' formed a detachment from the personnel and travelled to join Drummond's army near Fort Erie. With Drummond's approval, Dobbs and his men captured two schooners, USS Ohio and USS Somers, which had been left with the American army at Fort Erie. During the engagement, Netley's commanding officer, Lieutenant Radcliffe, was killed. Dobbs' detachment then joined Drummond's army for the assault on Fort Erie, where disaster struck and four dozen sailors and marines were killed, wounded or missing. Dobbs himself was injured during the battle.

After Yeo's squadron broke the blockade in mid-October, Star, Charwell and Netley came out of the Niagara River to ferry infantry reinforcements ashore and returned to Kingston with the squadron at the end of October. Netley's next action was on 28 November when the brig sailed in company with Montreal (the renamed Wolfe), Niagara (the renamed Royal George), Star and Charwell to resupply Drummond. They returned to Kingston on 9 December. The ship was laid up for the winter. The War of 1812 ended on 24 December 1814, with news reaching the Great Lakes in February 1815. In early 1815 Yeo was recalled to England. He departed Lake Ontario aboard Netley on 23 March sailing for Montreal.

Following the end of the war, Netley was still in commission with a reduced crew. In 1817, the Rush–Bagot Treaty came into effect, limiting the number of warships allowed on the Great Lakes by the British and Americans. The British began to wind down operations in Kingston, and by 1831, the Royal Navy sought to disband the station all together. Netley was sold in the 1830s and broken up.
