= Henry Eckford (shipbuilder) =

Scottish-American shipbuilder

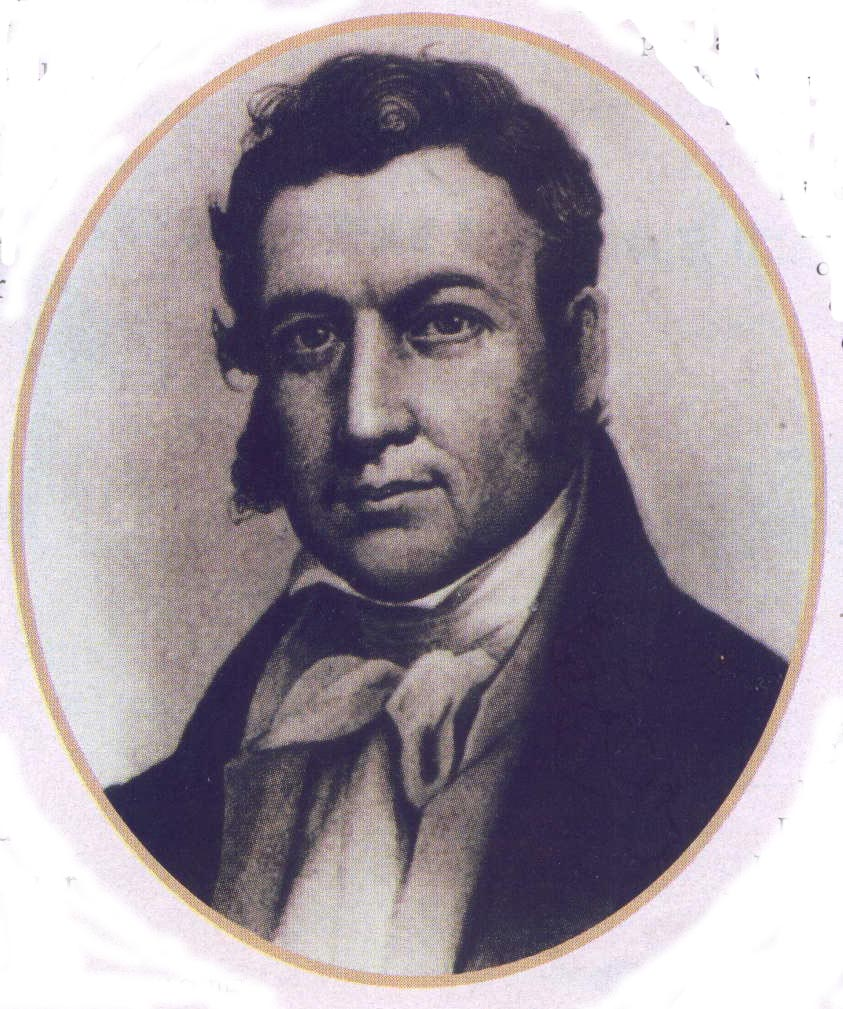
- Born: 12 March 1775; Kilwinning, North Ayrshire, Scotland
- Died: 12 November 1832 (aged 57); Constantinople, Ottoman Empire
- Resting place: St. George's Episcopal Church cemetery, Hempstead, New York
- Occupations: Naval architect, shipbuilder, industrial engineer, politician, businessman
- Years active: 1791–1832
- Relatives: John Black (ca. 1764–after 1819), uncle Joseph Rodman Drake (1795–1820), son-in-law James Ellsworth De Kay (1792–1851), son-in-law

Henry Eckford (12 March 1775 – 12 November 1832) was a Scottish-born American shipbuilder, naval architect, industrial engineer, and entrepreneur who worked for the United States Navy and the navy of the Ottoman Empire in the early 19th century. After building a national reputation in the United States through his shipbuilding successes during the War of 1812, he became a prominent business and political figure in New York City in the 1810s, 1820s, and early 1830s.

== Early life ==
Eckford was born in Kilwinning, Scotland, to Henry Eckford and Janet Black (a possibly unmarried couple) on 12 March 1775, the youngest of five sons. The family soon moved to nearby Irvine, where he attended school and became a lifelong friend of schoolmate John Galt, a future novelist. As a boy, Eckford trained as a ship's carpenter somewhere in Ayrshire, probably in the shipyard at Irvine on the Firth of Clyde.

In 1791, at the age of 16, Eckford left Scotland – to which he never returned – to begin a five-year shipbuilding apprenticeship with his mother's brother, the noted Scottish-born Canadian shipwright John Black, at a shipyard Black had established on the St. Lawrence River at Quebec City in Lower Canada. Eckford proved to be a hard worker and quick learner, with a flair for shipbuilding and ship design. When Black moved to Kingston, Upper Canada on Lake Ontario late in 1792, Eckford followed to continue his apprenticeship, but the two soon went their separate ways, with Black moving back to Quebec City to pursue revolutionary politics and purchase a shipyard in Lower Town from Ralph Gray while Eckford stayed behind in Kingston to continue to learn the shipbuilding trade. In 1794, Eckford joined a Freemason Lodge in Kingston, beginning a long association with Freemasonry.

In 1796, Eckford reached the age of 21 and completed his apprenticeship, becoming a shipwright (or "mechanic") with the title "master builder." He emigrated to the United States that year, settling in New York City – a booming city with a flourishing shipbuilding industry – to work as a journeyman in a boatyard on the East River.

== Personal life ==
In April 1799, the 24-year-old Eckford married 20-year-old Marion Bedell. They had nine children:.

Their daughter Sarah Eckford married the noted American poet Joseph Rodman Drake in 1816, and the couple gave Eckford his first grandchild in 1819. Another daughter, Janet Eckford, married the American zoologist James Ellsworth De Kay.

== Shipbuilding in New York ==
In 1799 or 1800, Eckford moved into a house on Long Island and opened his own shipyard on the East River in Brooklyn. He designed and built his first ship, the three-masted Sportsman (later renamed Samuel Elam) of 324 gross refgister tons, in 1800. Around 1802, he sold his yard and moved back across the river to New York City, where he and Edward or Lester Beebe (sources differ) opened a new shipyard together. The yard prospered, turning out a series of ships that were handy and seaworthy, and upon which Eckford built a reputation as a talented shipbuilder. He also befriended the successful New York shipbuilder Christian Bergh, and on 10 June 1803, became a United States citizen. He joined the Society of Mechanics and Tradesmen of the City of New York and a Freemason lodge, where he met such prominent New Yorkers as Mayor DeWitt Clinton, Governor Daniel Tompkins, Chancellor Robert Livingston, and John Jacob Astor, with whom he formed a lasting business partnership. Eckford built the three-masted ship Beaver (427 tons) for Astor in 1805, and the great success of the ship established him as one of New York's best naval architects and shipbuilders. Later in the year, he constructed the ship Magdalen for Astor, and in 1808 he built the brig Sylph for him.

Eckford did his first shipbuilding work for the United States Navy beginning in 1806, when the Eckford & Beebe shipyard built coastal gunboats for the Navy. In July 1808, Christian Bergh invited Eckford to join him in building the 14-gun U.S. Navy brig USS Oneida at Oswego, New York, on Lake Ontario. Although he did not design Oneida, the project enhanced his reputation further with the U.S. Navy and gave him experience in shipbuilding under the primitive conditions then prevailing along the New York shore of Lake Ontario.

Returning to New York City in 1809, Eckford bought out his partner Beebe and became sole owner of a new shipyard he established which would remain his main place of business for the rest of his life. For Astor, he built the brig Fox in 1809 and the ship Hannibal in 1810. Fox in particular was noted for her great speed thanks to the streamlined hull form Eckford designed for her, making the trip from Calcutta, India, to New York City in only 90 days – a record that would stand for 40 years – and making the round trip from New York to Calcutta and back in only seven months and 14 days. It was the speed of his ships thanks to their revolutionary hull form that gained Eckford great fame in the 19th century.

In September 1810, Eckford took on 16-year-old Isaac Webb as an apprentice at his yard. In the following years, Eckford would take on many other apprentices who would become important naval architects and shipbuilders in their own right, including John A. Robb, Jacob Bell, William Bennett, David Brown, Andrew Craft, John Dimon, John Englis, Thomas Megson, Stephen Smith, and Sidney Wright. In thus spreading naval architecture and shipbuilding expertise, Eckford made a significant contribution to the growth of American shipbuilding.

== The War of 1812 ==
After the War of 1812 began in June 1812, Eckford offered his services to United States Secretary of the Navy Paul Hamilton in a letter of 8 July 1812. U.S. Navy Commodore Isaac Chauncey was placed in command of all Navy forces in the Great Lakes region, and he had known Eckford since Chauncey had been master of John Jacob Astor's Eckford-built ship Beaver in 1806–1807 and had supervised Eckford & Beebe's construction of U.S. Navy gunboats in 1808. Chauncey visited New York City in the first week of September 1812 to meet with Eckford and his fellow shipbuilders Christian Bergh and Adam and Noah Brown about the problem of building a fleet of warships on Lake Ontario. Eckford, with experience in building ships in both Kingstown and Oswego, was an obvious choice for building ships for Chauncey on the Great Lakes, and Adam and Noah Brown also agreed to head north to design and build Chauncey's fleet, while Bergh agreed to remain in New York City and oversee the transportation of men and materiel north to Lake Ontario.

Suspending all work at his New York shipyard, Eckford gathered his apprentices and his best workers and set out a few days after the meeting with Chauncey for the approximately 300-mile (480-km) journey to Sackets Harbor, New York, on the northeastern shore of Lake Ontario, where he set about establishing a naval base and shipyard. He was the first of the men at the meeting to arrive on the Great Lakes. Chauncey joined him at Sackets Harbor on 6 October 1812, establishing his headquarters there, and finding that Eckford already had a shipyard in operation and had laid the keel of the 22-gun corvette USS Madison.

Despite terrible winter weather, Eckford not only quickly established a shipyard, but also quarters for the shipbuilders, mess and kitchen buildings, a hospital, offices, and blockhouses in what once had been merely a quiet hamlet, and made Sackets Harbor one of the U.S. Navy's main bases during the war, also taking the opportunity to invest in real estate in the area. With the shipyard in operation, Eckford took time away from it in December 1812 to join Chauncey in an inspection tour of American military and shipyard facilities on the Great Lakes and, finding the yards on Lake Erie at Erie, Pennsylvania, and Black Rock, New York, struggling, made suggestions to their staffs on how to improve their shipbuilding efforts. Chauncey wrote to Noah Brown to hurry north from New York City and take charge at Erie, which Brown did in February 1813 while his brother Adam remained in New York City to work with Christian Bergh in ensuring that Noah received the men and supplies he needed. Noah Brown later moved to Lake Champlain, and later still to Sackets Harbor, where he joined Eckford in ship design and construction activities.

At the Sackets Harbor shipyard, where Eckford had a work force of over 200 carpenters by April 1813 and of over 400 by April 1814 and where he employed over 800 men by January 1815, Eckford and the Browns combined to build all U.S. Navy men-of-war launched on Lake Ontario during the war. By 1814, the Sackets Harbor yard had converted some Great Lakes merchant vessels to carry guns and also had launched eight new purpose-built warships. Among the converted ships was the sloop-of-war USS Trippe; the new purpose-built warships ranged in size from the 89-ton schooner USS Lady of the Lake launched in 1813, to the never-finished 3,200-ton, 106-gun ship-of-the-line USS New Orleans, and also included the corvette USS General Pike in 1813 and the frigate USS Superior in 1814. Eckford understood that the American war effort on the Great Lakes required the U.S. Navy to keep ahead of British shipbuilding in Canada, and that speedy construction and delivery of warships was critical. Using prefabrication in New York City and on-site assembly in Sackets Harbor, he achieved what were considered breathtaking construction rates. Among the yard's most spectacular feats was the rapid construction of Madison, which took only nine weeks from the cutting of her timbers, and only 45 days from keel-laying, to launch on 26 November 1812; the yard went on to beat that record in November 1814 by taking only five weeks between laying the keel of the frigate USS Mohawk and launching her. The Sackets Harbor yard also built smaller ships in record time; the schooner USS Sylph took only 21 days from keel-laying to launch in 1813. Eckford also demonstrated a facility for dealing with labour crises, as demonstrated by an incident on 1 May 1814, when a United States Army soldier on sentry duty at Sackets Harbor shot and killed a carpenter after the launching of USS Superior, provoking an armed confrontation between soldiers and shipyard workers, who threatened to go on strike and go home, crippling American shipbuilding on the Great Lakes; Eckford joined Chauncey and the U.S. Army commander, Major General Jacob Brown, in talking to the men and defusing the situation, avoiding further violence and allowing shipyard work to continue.

With both the Browns and Eckford active at Sackets Harbor, it has become a bit murky as to what extent Eckford was involved in the building of some of the ships there. He was in charge of all shipbuilding there and probably prepared plans for most of the ships, but the Browns' contracts were independent of his, proposals for the Browns and Eckford to combine forces to build some of the ships do not appear to have borne fruit, and some of the ships the Browns built may have borrowed from Eckford's plans without him being otherwise involved in their construction. Despite tradition that he was, Eckford may not have been in involved the construction of New Orleans, but Lady of the Lake, Superior, General Pike, Madison, and Mohawk were his.

Eckford extended extensive credit to the United States Government during the war, going bankrupt in the process because of difficulty the government had in paying him, although he never doubted that it eventually would. His efforts, along with those of Adam and Noah Brown, were key to American success on Lake Ontario during the War of 1812. Chauncey wrote in praise of Eckford to Secretary of the Navy William Jones on 8 October 1813, saying, "...yet as Mr. Eckford has built 4 vessels at this place, and has become acquainted with the resources and people of this part of the country, I think that he could have built sooner and perhaps cheaper than perhaps any other man, and as to his talents as a ship carpenter, I am bold to say that there is not his equal in the United States, or perhaps the world. His exertions are unexampled...," and in a letter of 15 January 1814, Jones replied, "The talents and zeal of Mr. Eckford the builder, is a source of great satisfaction and confidence, which assures me that though the enemy has made great progress in the building of his two largest vessels, he will be over taken and surpassed in this branch of service by the superior energy and judgment of Mr. Eckford." In the words of maritime historian Howard I. Chapelle, "It was Eckford's extraordinary ability to design, lay down, and build ships, ranging in size from a very small schooner to the largest frigates, working in a wilderness and in severe winter weather with sick or dissatisfied labor, and to do all this in extremely short periods of time, that maintained American superiority on Lake Ontario." Chapelle continues, "From a naval shipbuilding point of view, the outstanding men of the War of 1812 were Eckford and the Browns, Adam and Noah. Through the efforts of these three, the [U.S.] Navy held control of the lakes and prevented the British from invading the North and Northwest [i.e., modern-day Ohio]... No officer or constructor of the Navy accomplished more. There were no competitors to the Browns and Eckford among the navy yards, or in the contract shipyards along the coasts, [even though] on the lakes... building was made infinitely more difficult than on the coast because of climate and geographical conditions, to say nothing of scarcities of labor and some materials." One advantage Eckford and the Browns may have had was a lack of attention by US government officials to their activities; Federal officials focused their efforts on the coasts, where they greatly interfered with shipbuilding decisions and progress during the war.

When word reached Sackets Harbor in late February 1815 that the War of 1812 had ended, Chauncey ordered Eckford and his employees to suspend all operations at Sackets Harbor and return home, leaving the never-launched USS New Orleans, planned as the largest ship in the world at the time, behind on the building ways. His work at Sackets Harbor had earned Eckford a national reputation as a hero of the war, and he returned to New York City to great praise for his wartime work on the Great Lakes.

== Post-war life in New York City ==
After returning to New York City, Eckford quickly became involved in naval design and construction at his yard there. The market for such ships was depressed after the war, however, so he took a job with the Navy as chief naval constructor at the Brooklyn Navy Yard in 1817, which he probably viewed as a temporary position until the market improved for privately built ships. While there, he and his apprentice Isaac Webb oversaw construction of the schooner USS Grampus, launched in 1821 and considered one of the fastest schooners of the day until she capsized and sank in a storm with the loss of all hands off Charleston, South Carolina, in 1843.

In 1817, the Brooklyn Navy Yard laid down the largely Eckford-designed 74-gun frigate USS Ohio; she was launched in 1820 and established a model upon which "74s" were built thereafter. Eckford resigned from his post at the yard on 6 June 1820, the week after Ohio was launched, and returned to running his private shipyard.

Ohio, however, would not see service for years. Funding for her completion was not forthcoming because the navy was not a high priority during the quiet 1820s and 1830s. Tradition holds that the ship also ran afoul of naval politics; it has been claimed that the Board of Navy Commissioners, led by Commodore John Rodgers, felt that Eckford had ignored their design for Ohio and blocked her completion. Chapelle, however, claims that no acrimony at all can be found in documents regarding the construction of Ohio, and that Eckford's design varied little from the Commissioners' ideas and sparked no controversy, and he ascribes the notion of a dispute between the Commissioners and Eckford to tradition. Ohio was considered a fine ship and she served in the Navy until 1883, and Eckford's departure from the Brooklyn Navy Yard probably had more to do with his own view of his employment there being a temporary position rather than any dispute he had with naval authorities.

Again in private life, Eckford returned to commercial shipbuilding, including the construction for John Jacob Astor of the ships Isabella and Henry Astor of 1820 and the brig Tamaahmaah of 1824.

Eckford's family moved in New York City's higher social circles, and he expanded his business interests, including ventures in the shipping, banking, insurance, and publishing sectors. He also became involved in politics, serving in the 40th New York State Legislature as a Democratic-Republican member of the New York State Assembly from 1816 to 1817, running unsuccessfully for the United States House of Representatives as a Clintonian Federalist in New York's 2nd congressional district in 1821, and serving in the Electoral College. At his shipyard, he built ships for the United States Government, including three lightships.

== Scandal and tragedy ==
Eckford's political activities led him to become part of the leadership of Tammany Hall. On 15 September 1826, he and other Tammany Hall leaders were indicted for committing millions of dollars in acts of fraud against banks, insurance companies, and private citizens. The first trial in the case ended in a hung jury in October 1826. Eckford was not brought to trial again, although other defendants were convicted in a second trial. Eckford sought an apology and public statement of his innocence from District Attorney Hugh Maxwell, but succeeded only in having Maxwell make a statement that Eckford had been duped by others into illegal acts. Eckford challenged Maxwell to a duel in December 1827, but Maxwell ignored him.

Thanks to Eckford's political connections, five different Congresses considered bills for the financial relief of Eckford and his heirs over the course of many years following the scandal.

In addition to his financial and legal problems, Eckford faced family tragedy. His oldest child Sarah, widowed when Joseph Rodman Drake suddenly died of consumption in 1820, fell ill in the autumn of 1827. On 23 January 1828, while caring for Sarah, Eckford's 19-year-old daughter Henrietta was badly burned when a fireplace set her dress on fire, and Eckford's 22-year-old son John also suffered severe burns while beating out the flames with his hands; within a few days, both Henrietta and John died of their injuries. Sarah Eckford meanwhile, never recovered from her illness; she lingered until 29 November 1828, when she died at the age of 28.

== Service to the Ottoman Empire ==
In the 1820s, American shipyards began to build ships for foreign navies. Eckford was part of this trend; in 1830, for example, he built the sloop-of-war Kensington in Philadelphia, Pennsylvania, for the Imperial Russian Navy, although ultimately the ship was delivered to Mexico instead.

After a shattering defeat of its navy in the Battle of Navarino in October 1827, the Ottoman Empire began looking for help in rebuilding its fleet. Eckford, seeking to rebuild his fortune and reputation after the scandals of 1826 and 1827, left New York in June 1831 aboard the new 1,000-ton, 26-gun corvette United States, which his yard had built on speculation in 1830–1831 and which he hoped to sell to the Ottomans. Eckford and his ship arrived in Constantinople in mid-August 1831. United States reputedly was a fast sailer, although she did not make particularly good time on her voyage from New York to Constantinople.

At first, Sultan Mahmud II thought that United States had arrived as a gift of the American government. Once he realized that she was a privately owned ship and was for sale, he purchased her. In the Ottoman Navy, she became Mesir-i Ferah.

Mahmud II then hired Eckford, who began to build ships in the Turkish shipyard for the Ottoman Navy, starting with a small schooner, a frigate, and a 74-gun ship constructed using a frame imported from New York City. He also began to design the 128-gun ship-of-the-line Mahmoudieh. Mahmud II was impressed enough to consider giving Eckford a high imperial rank.

== Death ==
Eckford's quick start in Ottoman service ended when he died suddenly in Constantinople on 12 November 1832, probably of cholera. Appropriately, his body was shipped home to New York City aboard the barque Henry Eckford, second ship of the name. He is buried with his wife in the cemetery at St. George's Episcopal Church in Hempstead, New York.

== Commemoration ==
The North Ayrshire, Scotland, town council calls Henry Eckford "the father of the U.S. Navy."

Various 19th-century baseball teams in the United States were named in honour of Henry Eckford. The most prominent one was Eckford of Brooklyn, a Brooklyn, New York, baseball team composed largely of local shipwrights; it played from 1855 to 1872 and was the national champion in 1862 and 1863. For at least four seasons, from 1860 to 1864, a separate "Henry Eckford" team also played in Brooklyn, while other teams named "Eckford" played in Albany, New York, from 1864 to 1867, in Syracuse, New York, in 1870, and in Newark, New Jersey, in 1870. In 2011, a 19th-century baseball club, composed of players from Long Island, was organized and adopted the name "Eckford of Brooklyn" or "Eckford Base Ball Club of Brooklyn". The club plays its home games at the Old Bethpage Village Restoration (OBVR) in Old Bethpage, New York, and won the in-house OBVR championship annually from 2012 through 2016 and the Mid-Atlantic Vintage Base Ball League (MAVBBL) Championship in 2016. The 21st-century Eckfords have quickly become one of the premier 19th-century baseball clubs in the United States.

In the late 19th century, a series of cigar bands commemorating important figures of the 19th century included Henry Eckford along with industrialist and philanthropist Andrew Carnegie, merchant and yachtsman Sir Thomas Lipton, inventor Samuel F. B. Morse, and industrialist and philanthropist Cornelius Vanderbilt.

The first steamboat with a compound engine, the commercial passenger-cargo steamer PS Henry Eckford, built in 1824 by Mowatt Brothers and Company and in service until 1841, was named for Henry Eckford.

One U.S. Navy ship, the fleet replenishment oiler USNS Henry Eckford (T-AO-192), has been named for Henry Eckford. Launched in 1989, she was never completed, and finally was scrapped in 2011.

Eckford Street in the Greenpoint neighborhood of Brooklyn, New York, is named for Henry Eckford.

A chain of lakes in the Adirondack Mountains in Indian Lake, New York, that Eckford surveyed in 1811 are named the Eckford chain for him.
