= USS Mohawk (1814) =

U.S. Navy frigate

History

United States
- Name: Mohawk
- Namesake: The Mohawk Nation
- Builder: Sackets Harbor yard of Henry Eckford
- Laid down: 8 May 1814
- Launched: 11 June 1814
- Decommissioned: 1815
- Fate: Sold ca. 1821

General characteristics
- Type: frigate
- Tonnage: 1,350
- Length: 155 ft 0 in (47.24 m) between perpendiculars
- Beam: 37 ft 6 in (11.43 m)
- Draft: 15 ft 6 in (4.72 m)
- Complement: 350 officers and enlisted men
- Armament: 26 × long 24–pounder guns; 16 × 32-pounder carronades

USS Mohawk was a U.S. Navy frigate that fought on the Great Lakes during the War of 1812.

Mohawk, a 42-gun frigate, was laid down 8 May 1814 by shipbuilder Henry Eckford at Sackets Harbor, New York, launched on 11 June 1814, and acquired by the U.S. Navy and placed in service shortly thereafter with Captain Jacob Jones in command. She was built very quickly, having been on the ways only 34 days when she was launched, and was large for her class of warship.

One of the large warships built under the direction of Commodore Isaac Chauncey for service against the British on Lake Ontario, Mohawk departed Sackets Harbor on 31 July 1814 in Chauncey's squadron to challenge the British squadron of Captain Sir James Yeo, Royal Navy, for control of the lake during the crucial Niagara campaign of 1814. Sailing up to the head of the lake seeking the British squadron, the American ships found it had retired to Kingston, Ontario.

In mid-July, Mohawk, in company with the full-rigged ships USS Superior, USS General Pike, and USS Madison, began a blockade of the Canadian port, remaining there for 45 days, providing valuable support for the army of Major General Jacob Brown in his campaign against the British posts along the Niagara frontier. On 21 September 1814 the frigate helped transport General Izard and 3,000 men from Sackets Harbor to the Genesee River and then resumed her blockade of Kingston until the end of the month. As winter began to close in, the American squadron retired to Sackets Harbor.

The War of 1812 ended 28 December 1814, long before the ice on the Great Lakes melted to allow further operations. Mohawk was then laid up in ordinary at Sackets Harbor.

Mohawk was reported unfit for repairs in 1821 and soon after sold and broken up.
