= Joseph Rodman Drake =

American poet

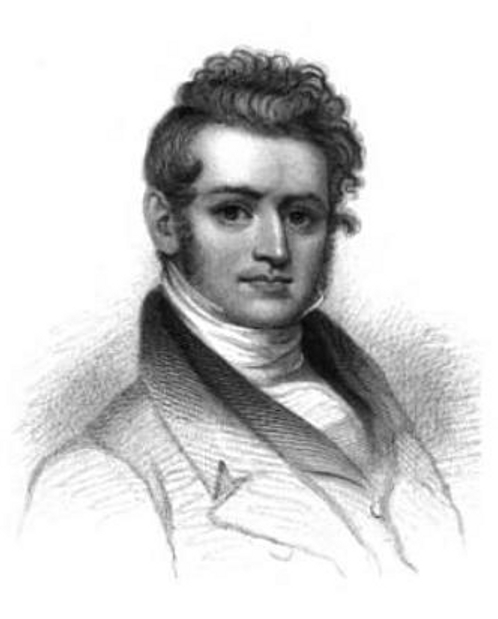
Joseph Rodman Drake

Joseph Rodman Drake (August 7, 1795 – September 21, 1820) was an early American poet.

== Biography ==
Born in New York City, he was orphaned when young and entered a mercantile house. While still a child, he showed a talent for writing poems. He was educated at Columbia College. In 1813 he began studying in a physician's office. In 1816 he began to practice medicine and in the same year married Sarah, daughter of Henry Eckford, a naval architect.

In 1819, together with his friend and fellow poet Fitz-Greene Halleck, he wrote a series of satirical verses for the New York Evening Post, which were published under the penname "The Croakers." Drake died of consumption a year later at the age of twenty-five.

As a writer, Drake is considered part of the "Knickerbocker group", which also included Halleck, Washington Irving, William Cullen Bryant, James Kirke Paulding, Gulian Crommelin Verplanck, Robert Charles Sands, Lydia M. Child, and Nathaniel Parker Willis. A collection of poems by Joseph Rodman Drake, The Culprit Fay and Other Poems, was published posthumously by his daughter in 1835. His best-known poems are the long title-poem of that collection, and the patriotic "The American Flag" which was set as a cantata for two soloists, choir and orchestra by the Czech composer Antonín Dvořák in 1892-93. "The Culprit Fay" served as the inspiration for a 1908 orchestral rhapsody of the same name by Henry Kimball Hadley.

Fitz-Greene Halleck's poem "Green be the turf above thee" was written as a memorial to Drake. Joseph Rodman Drake Park in Hunts Point, Bronx, a two-and-a-half-acre green space that contains his burial site in a small enclosed cemetery, was named for him in 1915. Buried here as well are members of the old local landowning families, notably the Hunts ("Hunts Point"), Leggetts, and Willets. This park has received $180,000 of New York State funding to memorialize slave workers who were thought to be buried there, and the remains of up to 11 enslaved Africans were rediscovered in 2013-14 by local students from P.S. 48, also known as the Joseph Rodman Drake School.

== Critical response ==
In the early 19th century Americans numbered Drake and his friend Halleck as two of the leading literary personalities and talents produced by their country, but their reputations were short-lived. In April 1836, Edgar Allan Poe published a review of their work–known to Poe scholars as "The Drake-Halleck Review"– in the Southern Literary Messenger criticizing both, though he thought Drake the better of the two. Poe's essay is as much a critique of the state of criticism at that time, objecting to the fact that "at this particular moment there are no American poems held in so high estimation by our countrymen, as the poems of Drake, and of Halleck." Looking at Drake's The Culprit Fay, a narrative poem of 640 lines, Poe found elements to praise but wrote that "the greater part of it is utterly destitute of any evidence of imagination whatever". He found Drake capable of description, but offered his view that description required little poetic ability and provided his own alternatives to show how simple this writing was. For Drakes' lines:

He put his acorn helmet on;
It was plumed of the silk of the thistle down:
The corslet plate that guarded his breast
Was once the wild bee's golden vest;
His cloak of a thousand mingled dyes,
Was formed of the wings of butterflies;
His shield was the shell of a lady-bug queen,
Studs of gold on a ground of green;*
And the quivering lance which he brandished bright
Was the sting of a wasp he had slain in fight.

Poe offered:

His blue-bell helmet, we have heard
Was plumed with the down of the hummingbird,
The corslet on his bosom bold
Was once the locust's coat of gold,
His cloak, of a thousand mingled hues,
Was the velvet violet, wet with dews,
His target was, the crescent shell
Of the small sea Sidrophel,
And a glittering beam from a maiden's eye
Was the lance which he proudly wav'd on high.

In Poe's view this ability creates "a species of vague wonder at the writer's ingenuity" in most readers, but Poe mocked it as an example of the "sublimely ridiculous" and "puerilities", requiring the reader to "imagine a race of Fairies in the vicinity of West Point".

== Works ==
- The American Flag
- The Culprit Fay: and Other Poems (1835)
