= Garrett J. Pendergrast =

American naval officer (1802–1862)

Garrett Jesse Pendergrast
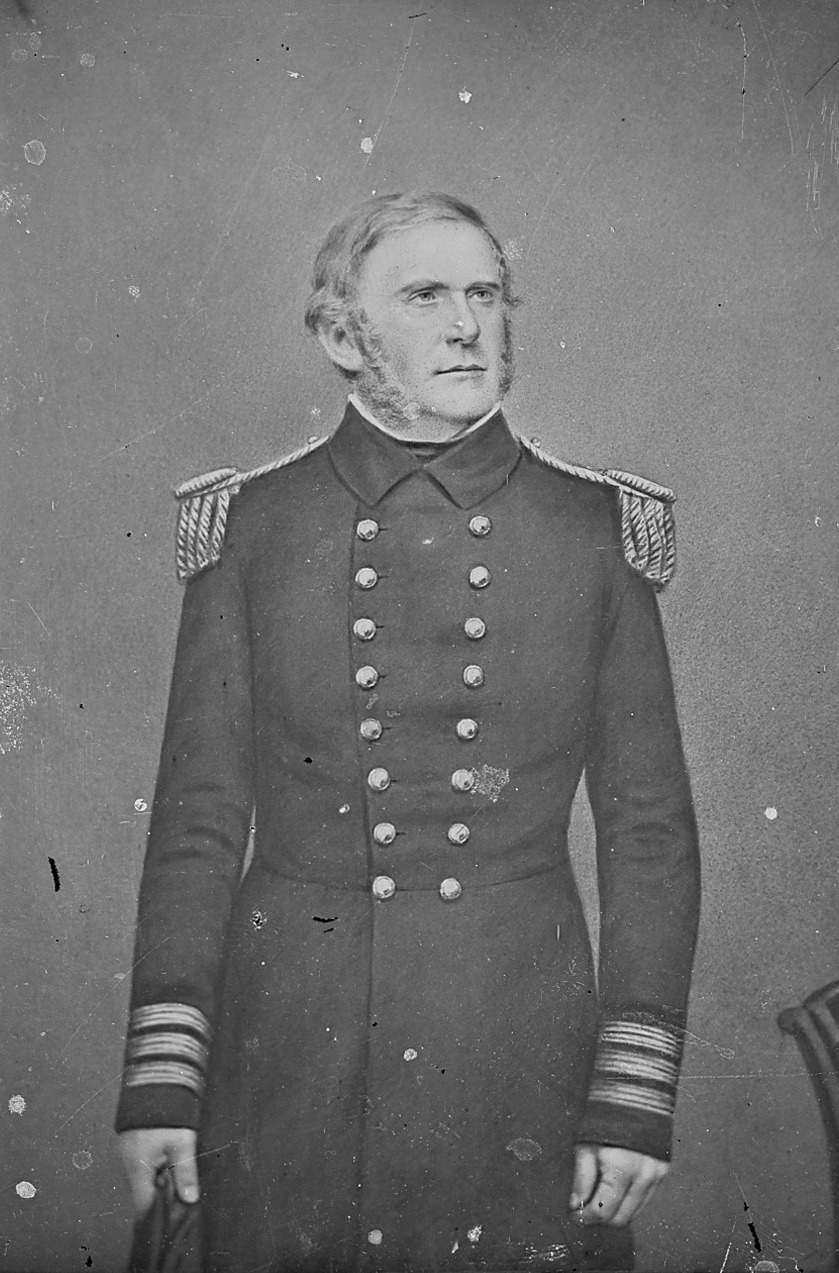
- Commodore Garrett J. Pendergrast, studio portrait by Mathew Brady
- Born: December 5, 1802; Kentucky, U.S.
- Died: November 7, 1862 (aged 59); Philadelphia, Pennsylvania, U.S.
- Burial place: Laurel Hill Cemetery; Philadelphia, Pennsylvania, U.S.
- Military career
- Allegiance: United States
- Branch: United States Navy
- Service years: 1812–1862
- Rank: Commodore
- Commands: USS Boston; USS Saranac; USS Merrimack; USS Columbia; Home Squadron; USS Cumberland; Philadelphia Navy Yard
- Conflicts: War of 1812; Capture of the sloop Anne; Mexican–American War; American Civil War

Commodore Garrett Jesse Pendergrast (December 5, 1802 – November 7, 1862) was an American naval officer who served in the United States Navy during the War of 1812 and as part of the Brazil Squadron and Home Squadron. He served in the Union Navy during the American Civil War. He commanded the USS Cumberland during the loss of the Gosport Navy Yard in Norfolk, Virginia to Confederate forces and captured 16 Confederate ships in the early stages of the Union blockade. He served as commander of the Philadelphia Navy Yard from October 1861 until his death in November 1862.

== Career ==
Pendergrast was born on December 5, 1802, in Kentucky. He entered the United States Navy as a midshipman on January 1, 1812, and served during the War of 1812. He was promoted to lieutenant on March 3, 1821.

In March, 1825, he participated in the capture of the sloop Anna. Pendergrast was one of twenty-six sailors ordered by John D. Sloat to pursue the pirate Roberto Cofresi and force his ship aground in Puerto Rico, which led to his capture.

He was promoted to commander on September 8, 1841. On October 27, 1843, he recommissioned the sloop Boston at Boston and sailed to the South Atlantic to join the Brazil Squadron. He returned to the New York Navy Yard in February 1846.

As part of the Home Squadron, he commanded the steam sloop USS Saranac in 1852 and the sailing frigate USS Columbia from 1853 to 1854.

Promoted to Captain on May 24, 1855, he commissioned the frigate Merrimack on February 20, 1856. He voyaged to the Caribbean and Western Europe in 1856 and 1857. He returned to Boston and the Merrimack was repaired and redeployed to the Pacific Squadron from 1857 to 1859.

On September 24, 1860, Pendergrast sailed from Philadelphia aboard the sloop Pawnee in order to assume command of the Home Squadron, then operating off the coast of Mexico.

=== Civil War ===
At the outbreak of the American Civil War in 1861, Pendergrast was in command of the frigate Cumberland at anchor near the Gosport Navy Yard awaiting repairs. The Secretary of the Navy, Gideon Welles, ordered Pendergrast to remain in the Hampton Roads area to protect Gosport Navy Yard and Fort Monroe. Pendergrast positioned the Cumberland off the harbor to either defend it or protect the escape of Federal ships. Most of the blame for the loss of the Gosport Navy Yard fell to Charles Stewart McCauley although some of it was also placed on Pendergrast who controlled the Federal fleet on the Atlantic coast.

At the age of 58, Pendergrast was one of the oldest officers in service. On April 24, 1861, Pendergrast and the Cumberland, accompanied by a small flotilla of support ships, seized Confederate ships and privateers in the vicinity of Fort Monroe off the Virginia coastline. Within the next two weeks, Pendergrast had captured 16 enemy vessels, which showed that the Union blockade could be effective.

He was promoted to commodore on July 16, 1862. In October 1861, Pendergrast was assigned to command the Philadelphia Navy Yard. He suffered a stroke on November 3, 1862, and died on November 7, 1862. He was interred at Laurel Hill Cemetery in Philadelphia.

== Personal life ==
At the age of 24, he married Susan Virginia Barron, daughter of Commodore James Barron. Upon the Secession, she reportedly refused to accompany her husband in his allegiance to the United States and swore she would never live with him again.

== Dates of rank ==
- Midshipman - 1 January 1812
- Lieutenant - 3 March 1821
- Commander - 8 September 1841
- Captain - 24 May 1855
- Commodore, Retired List - 16 July 1862
