= John Black (Lower Canada politician) =

Canadian politician

- Born: c. 1764; Scotland
- Died: after 1819; Scotland
- Occupation(s): Shipbuilder, politician

John Black (c. 1764 – after 1819) was a Scottish-born shipbuilder and political figure in Lower Canada. He represented Quebec County in the Legislative Assembly of Lower Canada from 1796 to 1800.

== Life ==
Black was the son of William Black and Jane McMun. He came to Quebec around 1786 and worked as a ship's carpenter with William King on the Baie des Chaleurs. In 1789, Black and King established a shipbuilding firm at Quebec City; Black became sole owner in 1791. In that year he took on as his shipbuilding apprentice his sister's Scottish-born son, Henry Eckford; Eckford would leave for New York City in 1796 and go on to become a famed American shipbuilder of the War of 1812 and one of the most prominent naval architects of the early 19th century.

Black purchased a shipyard from Ralph Gray in 1792. Later that year, he was appointed master shipbuilder for the government on Lake Ontario (at Kingston Royal Naval Dockyard).

Black returned to operating his own business in late 1793. In 1794, during the militia riots, he was employed by Attorney General James Monk to expose possible revolutionaries by pretending to be sympathetic to French interests. In 1797, Black exposed the French spy David McLane, who was later convicted of high treason and executed. Black was captured by a French privateer while sailing a ship to England in 1798 but managed to escape, returning to Quebec in 1799.

After his 1796-1800 stint in the Legislative Assembly of Lower Canada, Black withdrew his candidacy in the elections held in 1800 in favour of Jonathan Sewell. He married Jane Rawson in 1801. She was the daughter of British Sergeant Sentlaw Rawson and his first wife Sarah Oxford. According to the Osborne papers, The Migration of the Voyageurs of Drummond Island to Penetanguishene, 1828, Sentlaw Rawson was the officer who lowered the British flag surrendering Drummond Island from British hands to American dictated by the Treaty of Ghent after the war of 1812.

Around this time, Black was involved in real estate investments and later in shipbuilding, but was not successful. From 1806 to 1815, he went to England a number of times, seeking a government salary, land grant, or other compensation for the services that he had performed earlier, but without success. Black left Quebec for good in 1817 and died in Scotland several years later.
