= Capture of the sloop Anne =

1825 sea battle

Coordinates: 17.9175°N 66.2210°W

- Part of West Indies Anti-Piracy Operations, Piracy in the Caribbean
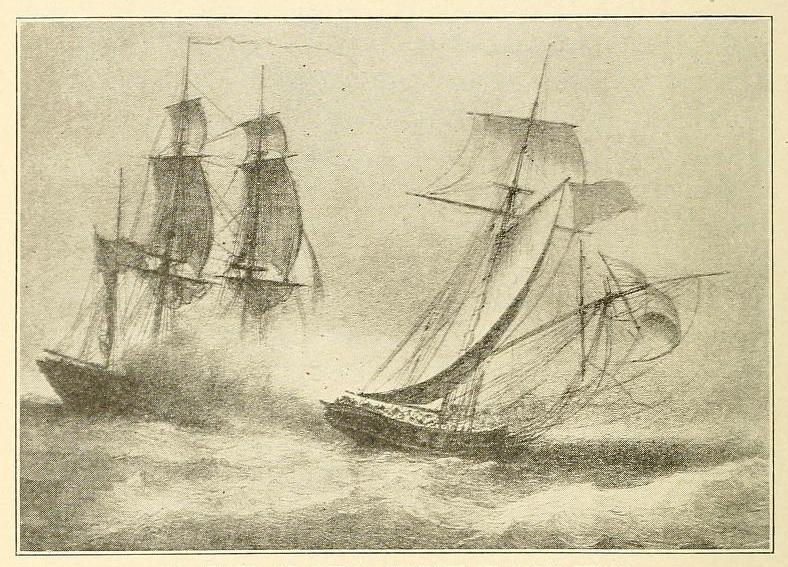
- Una Goleta de Guerra Persigue un Barco Pirata, the artwork used to depict the event in Paul G. Miller's Historia de Puerto Rico (1922).
Date	March 5, 1825
Location	Caribbean Sea; within the seaward boundaries of the municipalities of Salinas and Guayama, Puerto Rico, Spanish West Indies
Result	Anne is disabled; pirates flee ashore

Belligerents
Tri-national anti-piracy alliance: Denmark; Spain; United States	Roberto Cofresí's pirates

Commanders and leaders
John D. Sloat; Tomás Renovales; Garrett J. Pendergrast; Juan Bautista Pierety; Salvador Pastoriza	Roberto Cofresí

Strength
United States: 1 schooner 140 sailors and marine infantry Spain/Denmark: 3 sloops sailors and marine infantry Support: 1 frigate sailors and marine infantry	3 sloops 1 schooner At least a dozen armed pirates on the flagship

Casualties and losses
~2 wounded 1 sloop damaged	~3 killed 6 wounded 1 sloop captured

A naval campaign carried out by an alliance between the Spanish Empire forces in Puerto Rico, the Danish government in Saint Thomas and the United States Navy captured Roberto Cofresí's pirate sloop Anne. The powers pursued Roberto Cofresí's pirate flotilla in March 1825 because of the economic losses suffered by the parties to the pirates, as well as diplomatic concerns caused by their use of the flags of Spain and Gran Colombia which menaced the fragile peace between the naval powers. Several of those involved had been attacked by the freebooters. Among the diplomatic concerns caused by Cofresí was a robbery carried out by several of his subordinates, the catalyst of an incident that threatened war between Spain and the United States known as "The Foxardo Affair", eventually leading to the resignation of his rival, pirate hunter David Porter.

Sailing under the authorization of the Danish West Indies, the coalition employed two local ships, including a former victim of the pirates named San José y las Animas and USS Grampus of the West Indies Squadron. A ship from Gran Colombia, named La Invencible, also provided support during the initial stages. The final naval engagement took place on March 5, 1825, and began with a trap set at Boca del Infierno, a passage off Bahía de Jobos, Puerto Rico. The flagship of Cofresí's flotilla, the sloop Anne (otherwise known as Ana), was baited by the set up. Surprised and outnumbered, the pirates abandoned the ship and escaped to shore, where they were captured by Puerto Rican authorities and placed on military trial. With the execution of Cofresí, the West Indies Anti-Piracy Operations were considered a success and he came to be known as "the last of the West India pirates".

== Background ==
=== Cofresí's modus operandi ===
While still regarded as a Don, Cofresí began his criminal life in Puerto Rico by leading a band of highway robbers which made a profit by assaulting farmers and merchants, from whom they would steal merchandise which was later sold by close friends and family. The government soon began a campaign to capture the gangs related to these crimes, most of which were from Cabo Rojo. It was another respected and wealthy man, Juan Bey, who first exposed Cofresí as the man behind these bands while being prosecuted for murder. This led to the arrest of him and several collaborators, but he was able to escape. A fugitive on land, Cofresí had already turned to piracy by 1823. Due to previous experience as a seafarer, he knew the geography of the region well and exploited this to his advantage. While on the run, the pirates would enter the adjacent Boquerón Bay, which provides ample hiding spots through the mangroves and a cavern system that runs throughout its karst geography. The bay itself proved a strategic spot for the distribution of the plundered goods. Bahia de Tallaboa at Peñuelas and Bahía de Jobos served as additional hideouts in the southern coast, being surrounded by a series of islets and coral reefs that are only navigable by small draft vessels. Additional options included shanty towns such as those employed by salt harvesters that littered Cabo Rojo, Guanica and Lajas.

The actions of Cofresí came close to starting a war between Spain and the United States due to the losses of the latter to pirate ships flying the flag of the former. Consequently, Governor Miguel de la Torre soon earned a particular interest in the actions of Cofresí and was quoted stating that his name "gained celebrity due to his fearlessness and atrocities, [not even] the tranquil neighbor, the laborious merchant [or] the honest farmer felt safe from the claws of this criminal". In 1824, he enacted a series of measures that relegated the local criollos in favor of Spanish immigrants, minimizing the influence of the Ramirez de Arellano family. The newly arrived loyalists in turn responded by exposing the symbiosis that existed between this class and the pirates, soon establishing a prominent campaign to capture Cofresí. Despite the official posture on piracy and his bold actions, capturing Cofresí would prove complicated, since he was already gathering a mythical reputation in Puerto Rico and becoming highly influential. Guayama's major, Francisco Brenes, documented how the pirates gathered several friends among the local population who would also protect them. His figure was held with such regard that some members of the higher classes were arrested due to their links with Cofresí. Cofresí was said to exploit this in his favor, creating an underground circle that would share information with him.

Despite his influence among the criollos, most of the pirate's close associates were black or mixed-race men in their 20s and early 30s who were incapable of thriving under the casta system, and instead opted to become thieves, murderers and other sorts of criminals. Such was the case of José "Pepe" Cartagena, Juan Antonio Delgado Figueroa, José de Rosario, Juan "El Indio" de los Reyes, Carlos Díaz de la Concepción, Miguel "Beltrán" Ramos Ayala, Juan Carlos Ascencio de Torres, Torres Juan Francisco "Ceniza" Pizarro and Miguel "El Rasgado" de la Rosa. (Note: Both vagrants, Cartagena and Ramos were cohorts in crime before joining Cofresí. De los Reyes was a deserter and a thief. A cattle raider, Delgado was also a pirate aboard the Tortolan fishing boat John Hendrick before joining Cofresí. Miguel de la Rosa was a fugitive slave. Torres was responsible for the murder of sailor Bernardo Arismendi. Del Rosario was a hustler and a thief.) Others such as José Rodríguez, Jaime Márquez, Pedro Alacán and Joaquín "El Campechano" Hernández had previously served aboard the privateering vessels Punta Pitre, La Fortuna, Josefa, Carmen and La Porteña. The real age of Hernández has been debated, since reports claim that he was either Cofresí's cabin boy or an older man, with the latter being most likely. Following a series of diplomatic disputes, the issue of letters of marque by Spain was suspended during the final months of 1823, which fueled the recruitment of experienced sailors into the crew.

=== Relevant attacks ===
On June 9, 1824, Cofresí boarded a schooner named San José y Las Animas near Peñuelas, Puerto Rico. The vessel was fully loaded and carried over 6,000 pesos. The ship, property of Santos Lucca, was captained by Francisco Ocasio and was ferrying the cargo for a third party, the Mattei family. On that day, it was completing a journey between Saint Thomas and Puerto Rico, which was its usual route. Ocasio reacted to the attack by sailing towards land and allowing his guests to disembark, but was unable to outmaneuver the pirates, who quickly boarded and stole all but a scant portion of the merchandise. The routes between Puerto Rico and the Danish West Indies would become a favored target for attacks, focusing on ships from the islands of Saint Thomas and Saint Croix. The assaults that Cofresí's flotilla led against international vessels soon attracted the attention of the West Indies Squadron, which began pursuing him after the capture of the American merchant vessels named John and William Henry. At the height of this search, the schooners USS Beagle, USS Grampus and USS Shark were patrolling the waters of Puerto Rico. Despite this, Cofresí was undeterred and instead adopted a strategy of using the speed of its vessels to potshot the military ships. On the evening of January 25, 1825, while Sloat scouted the west coast on Grampus, the pirates intercepted it. Cofresí then commanded a bold attack, threatening the military crew with musket fire and demanding that it drop sails. When Grampus retaliated, the pirates outsailed the schooner and docked at Naguabo, Puerto Rico, where they continued their plundering streak. The crew of Grampus tried to track them, but after failing to locate anyone in hours abandoned the area.

On February 10, 1825, Cofresí boarded a sloop named Neptune while it was docked at Jobos Bay. The pirates ambushed the merchant sloop's crew, led by its owner, Salvador Pastoriza, by firing muskets at it. The merchant was able to escape from the ship amidst the gunfire, but was injured and witnessed as the pirates looted Neptune. After completing this task, Cofresí commandeered the sloop out of the Bay and assimilated it into his flotilla. Neptune was then used in the attack on two Danish vessels, property of W. Furniss, once again disrupting the trade of the Danish West Indies. By targeting this route the pirates directly affected merchant Juan Bautista Pierety, who worked several routes between the ports of Guayama, Salinas, Ponce and Saint Thomas. Besides being the owner of several of Cofresí's victims, he reported personally seeing part of the pirate's flotilla, a sloop and schooner, docked at Boca del Infierno. On February 15, 1825, Cofresí led the attack on another Danish sloop named Anne at Quebrada de Palmas port in Naguabo. The pirates employed the same tactic as before, surprising the crew while they were distracted with the cargo. Cofresí then mugged Anne's captain, Beagle's navigator John Low, stealing $20 from him. The ship's crew was forced to leap overboard and were left behind while the pirates commandeered the vessel.

=== Foxardo (Fajardo) Affair ===
On October 24, 1824, the second-in-command of Cofresí's fleet, Bibián Hernández Morales, led a group of pirates to the Danish colony of Saint Thomas. There they plundered an establishment named Cabot, Bailey & Company, carrying 5,000 dollars in loot and returned to Puerto Rico. Aware of the incident, Charles T. Platt of the West Indies Squadron left that port aboard Beagle two days later, accompanied by one of the affected merchants. The vessel first encountered the pirates off Vieques, but was unable to capture any. However, they were able to gather information that led them to Fajardo. Upon arriving there, Platt, who was not wearing a uniform, explained his operation to the port captain through a translator. The crew was then taken before Mayor Francisco Caro and handed him a letter (originally intended for an associate of the merchant named Juan Campos) with the details of the robbery, but the functionary ordered a search of his ship and documents. Platt left the vicinity in protest and walked towards Beagle, but was arrested along with Midshipman Robert Ritchie and categorized as a suspect himself, being held prisoner under the supervision of the town's mayor. While this happened, some of the stolen goods were tracked to Naguabo with the help of Campos (who was later uncovered as a double agent and one of Cofresí's cohorts). Hours later, the process to transfer him to a local jail was completed, but Platt offered resistance and threatened to fight back. This was followed by more delays, but the crew of Beagle was ultimately allowed to leave port without further repercussions.

Upon returning to Saint Thomas, Platt quickly contacted Commodore David Porter and presented his account of the events at Fajardo. After interviewing all of the involved, the officer concluded that the mayor and his subordinates were in fact buying time for the pirates, in the process allowing the mobilization of loot to a less conspicuous location. Shortly afterwards, the local Consular Agent Stephen Cabot brought him reports that Campos had bought the stolen goods. Incensed by this revelation, Porter ordered that an unsanctioned expedition was to leave port. The commodore led the flotilla aboard the frigate USS John Adams, and was joined by Grampus and Beagle. Porter arrived at Fajardo on November 14, 1824, and delivered a letter demanding an explanation to the local authorities. In this missive, the commodore also warned that, if ignored, he would march with his troops to the town within an hour, and that if the military tried to defend it, the result would be the "total destruction" of Fajardo.

However, the Spanish authorities took the action as an attack and began arming the port's artillery. Noticing this, Porter sent sailors to disable it and subsequently commanded the landing of two hundred additional marines. The division marched onwards until they halted at the town's entrance, where the Spanish stood ready to defend it. Aware that the diplomatic crisis could lead to a full blown war between Spain and the United States and still within the grace period, the mayor and the captain of the port arrived at the scene and offered apologies to Platt and Porter. The marines were then directed to march to the vessels and returned to Saint Thomas. The local United States ambassador soon received confirmation of Campos's real allegiance. The Spanish government then took further actions to prevent repercussions, removing both the mayor and the captain of the port from their offices, and beginning a process to purge the accomplices of the pirates. The government of the United States did its part to control the damage, and Porter was soon placed on court-martial.

== Preparations ==
=== Victims of Cofresí rendezvous in St. Thomas ===
The arrival of Low at his home base of St. Thomas coincided with the visit of USS Grampus. Shortly afterwards, a vessel arrived from Puerto Rico, its captain having seen Cofresí's flagship at Vieques. Upon learning of the incident and with the current whereabouts of the pirates known, Sloat made a request to the port authorities in St. Thomas and was able to find three captains willing to help in the mission. Two men from Puerto Rico, Salvador Pastoriza and Pierety, volunteered their ships, which also possessing Danish documents could sail from that port. (Note: Puerto Rican vessels often possessed official documents from friendly nations besides Spain, which they used to defend themselves from privateers.) After his request was met, Sloat held a reunion with the governor of St. Thomas, Peter Carl Frederik von Scholten. The captain pleaded for authorization to launch an expedition to Puerto Rico and Vieques from the port of St. Thomas, also appealing for the use of the three sloops. Aware that both the Danish and American navies had been unsuccessfully searching for Cofresí and shared a common interest, the governor conceded the use of the ships. Furthermore, these were the same pirates that had captured and commandeered the sloops Neptune and Anne (both operating under Danish papers, but based at St. Thomas), attacked another sailing off St. Croix, and sacked several local stores during an incident. The only demand of the Danish government was that they were to be used only for this mission.

Preparations were quickly completed, and no new incidents occurred during this period. Sloat delegated command of the two Spanish ships to lieutenants Garrett J. Pendergrast and Wilson, assigning 20 sailors per sloop. The former boarded Pierety's ship, the pirates' former victim San José y Las Animas. (Note: San José y Las Animas is referred to as Dolphin in the English version of the account, due to its employment of different names depending on the flag being flown.) Hearing the news, the captain of a Colombian brigantine named La Invencible requested to join, being granted a place in the mission. The command of the third ship was granted to a sailor of this ship, who brought along part of the Colombian crew and weapons. Due to his familiarity with both the pirates and Anne, Low was recruited into the crew. Pierety, on the other hand, contributed his knowledge of the geography to aid in directing the search. To aid in the mission, governor von Scholten ordered that no vessels could leave the St. Thomas port during the following days, drastically reducing the maritime traffic and preventing any of Cofresí's associates from reaching him in time. With preparations in place, the expedition left port before the dawn of March 1, 1825.

=== Coastal search and Cofresí's audacity ===
The flotilla arrived at Vieques at dawn. The sloops were then sent north, where they investigated potential hideouts used by the pirates. Grampus remained along with La Invencible and monitored the adjacent waters. The initial search did not bring any novelties, and the American marines were transported from the sloops to Grampus to spend the night. After coming short the first day, the search was moved to the western coast of Vieques and the eastern coast of Puerto Rico. Meeting the same result, the marines once again moved back into Grampus. On March 3, the expedition moved to the southeast coast of Puerto Rico and sailed west, investigating several geographic features that could provide a natural haven for Cofresí. Unfruitful, the flotilla prepared to dock at Ponce during the evening. However, La Invencible abandoned the mission shortly before docking. With Simón Bolívar's campaign against Spain raging on, the vessel could have been considered an enemy and its crew risked being taken as prisoners or losing the ship if they arrived at a Spanish colony. Grampus and two of the sloops landed, with San José y Las Animas arriving an hour later. After being allowed to rest, the sailors were allowed to disembark and buy supplies.

At ten in the morning, while they were carrying out these tasks, Cofresí nonchalantly sailed in front of the port's entrance while heading east. Pierety and Low confirmed the identity of the vessel with some of the locals: it was Anne. By this time, Cofresí was already aware of the mission, but believed that the expedition had since returned to St. Thomas, failing to notice their presence in time. Now aware of the proximity of the pirates, the Spanish authorities and Sloat established a strategy that placed troops on land while the flotilla engaged them at sea. Sloat requested help from mayor José de Torres and the military commander of southern Puerto Rico, Tomás de Renovales, which was promptly granted. The task of organizing the militia troops of the adjacent municipalities of Salinas, Pastillas and Guayama was relegated to captain Manuel Marcano. Renovales himself doubled the patrol of the coastal towns. Once again, Pierety volunteered San José y Las Animas for the impending engagement and had help from subdelegate Salvador Blanch Castelló, who armed the ship with a six-pound cannon and rounded up volunteers. Sloat provided weapons for the new arrivals and assigned additional forces, including medic Samuel Biddle and lieutenants Pendergrast and George A. Magruder, for a total of 23 sailors. Lastly, Low was brought on board San José y Las Animas, where he was joined by a fellow victim of the pirates, Antonetty. This ship was the first to leave port around 4:00 p.m. with a route that extended from Fajardo to Ponce. At dawn, Grampus and one of the Danish sloops sailed towards Caja de Muerto. The second vessel was commanded by lieutenant Wilson and Pastoriza was among its crew.

== San José y las Animas's trap and naval engagement ==
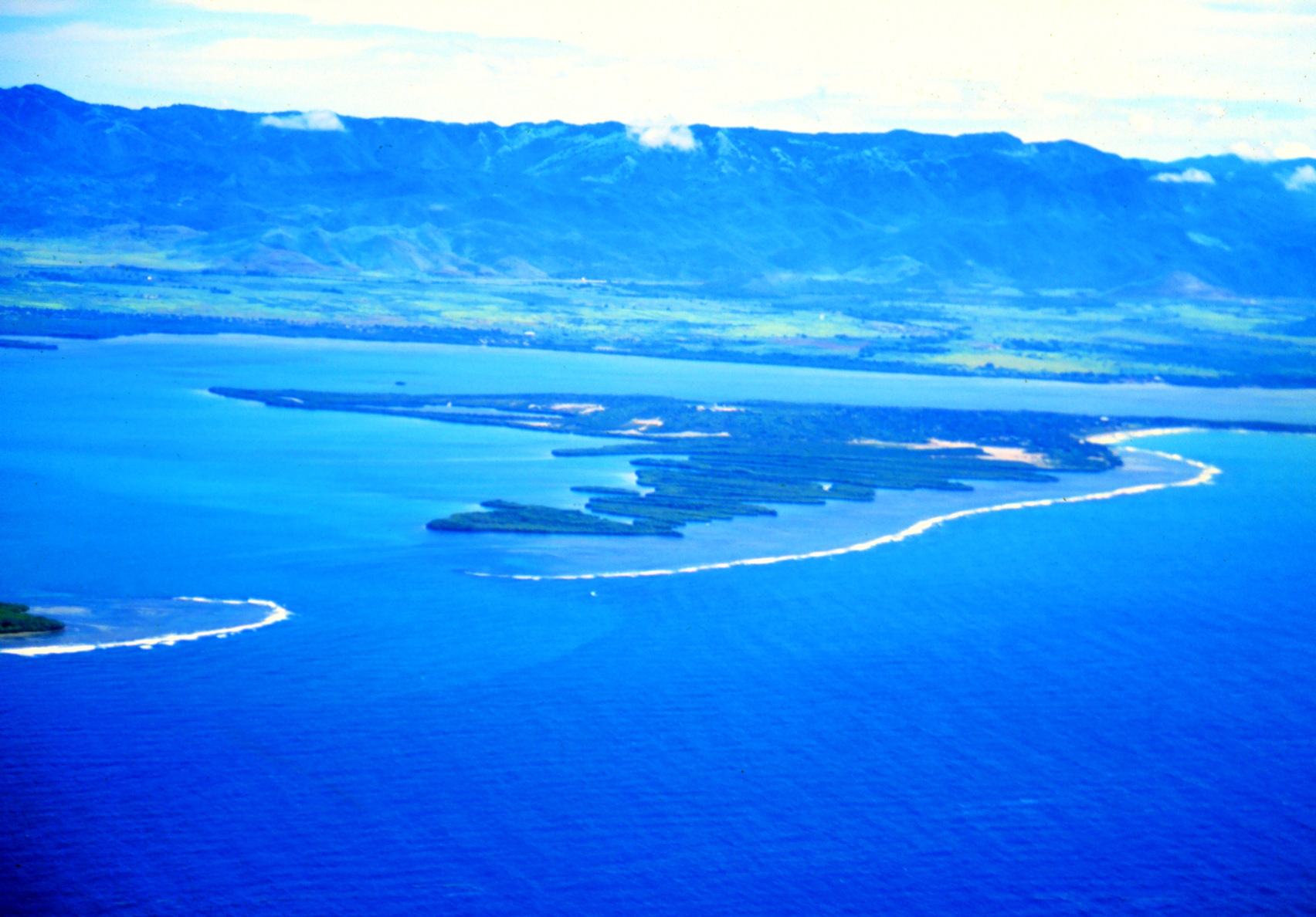
An aerial view of Jobos Bay depicts Boca del Infierno (the leftmost passage).

On March 5, 1825, San José y las Animas was in the process of scouting the coast when Low recognized Anne sailing off Jobos Bay. Cofresí was leaving one of his most enduring hideouts and was traversing Boca del Infierno, a channel leading into Jobos Bay that is located between two keys, Cayo Caribes and Cayos de Barca. Pendergrast decided to set up a trap by posing as a merchant vessel, ordering all of his marines and the Spanish militiamen to lie down on the deck and wait, ready to open fire. Cofresí, unaware that the military was employing sloops in his search, assumed that it was a merchant ship and ordered his crew to approach it. When Anne was close enough, Pendergrast ordered the troops to fire the cannon and empty their rifles. Cofresí was surprised by the trap, but soon realized the situation and ordered a retaliation, firing his own cannon and having his crew return musket fire. The crew of San José y las Animas then signaled the Spanish troops on land. While the Spanish ship pursued Anne, Cofresí employed evasive tactics and answered with multiple waves of musket fire.

The naval engagement lasted for 45 minutes, during which San José y las Animas exploited the offensive position that it had gained during the surprise attack, damaging the mast and hull of Anne. Having been injured along with Juan Carlos Torres and Juan Manuel de Fuentes during the initial bewilderment, Cofresí ordered his crew to turn towards Playa de los Rodeos with the intention of escaping inside the adjacent mangroves and swamp. Two members of his crew were killed before Anne landed (one of them identified as Portalatín). San José y las Animas then directed its cannon to fire at the shore, managing to hit and kill pirate Juan de Mata with a shot to the midsection. Cofresí himself was able to escape inland, but his crew were scattered. Thanks to their surprise attack, the crew of the Spanish sloop suffered no casualties. Minutes later, the now abandoned Anne was claimed by the marine troops. San José y las Animas sailed towards the adjacent Jobos shipyard, where Antonetty disembarked, alerted the Spanish troops stationed there, and mobilized the civilians to help in the search for the escaped pirates.

== Aftermath ==
=== Capture of Cofresí ===
Shortly afterwards, Pierety proceeded to make an inventory of Anne's cargo. On board the military found Spanish and Danish papers, a four-pound cannon, several muskets and guns, sabers and shaving blades. Pierety also led the refloating of Anne. As soon as the news reached the coast, the militias led by captain Manuel Marcano sprang into action. At Guayama, the local troops began a search throughout the municipality. Parallel to this, mayor Francisco Brenes and Eugenio de Silvia, the subdelegate of the navy, did the same. Around 10:00 p.m. the first three pirates were caught. Another named Vicente Carbajal was found alone, still armed with a rifle. Through the search, Brenes acted in coordination with his colleague from Patillas, Tomás Pérez Guerras. Accompanied by two members of his crew, Cofresí managed to remain a fugitive until the next day. However, their pace was affected by the hostility of the swampy terrain. Near midnight, a Puerto Rican mulatto named Juan Candido Garay spotted Cofresí and his crew. Joined by fellow militiamen Domingo de Rivera, Matías Quiñones and Juan Rodríguez, the group ambushed the pirates.

Cofresí and his cohorts tried to flee through the brush. But, slowed down by the injuries suffered in the engagement, he was unable to avoid a blunderbuss shot from Garay that hit his left arm. Despite being knocked down by the blast, the pirate was able to stand up and retrieve a knife. However, the remaining militiamen intervened and attacked Cofresí at once with machetes, leaving him severely injured. The same tactic was used on one of his cohorts. The noise attracted reinforcements led by Eugenio de Silva, who were then joined by captain Luis Sánchez, the man commissioned by Brenes to capture the pirates. The group was completed by captain Manuel Sánchez and corporal José María Bernabé. However, the military commander of Ponce, Manuel Marcano, was the one credited by the government for the work of Garay and the rest of the militiamen, although he had never arrived at the scene. Due to their race, governor Miguel de la Torre only granted a silver medal and a certificate recognizing their work to the Puerto Rican militiamen. (Note: Under similar merits, a white man would have received a medal made of gold.)

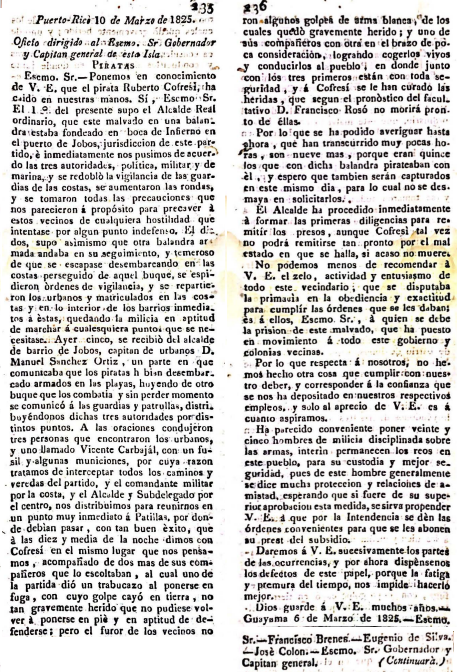
La Gaceta de Puerto Rico reports the capture of Cofresí in a column authored by Francisco Brenes.

After arriving at the Guayama jail, doctor Francisco Rosó tended Cofresí's wounds and declared that he would not die from them. Cofresí was bound from hands and feet, while the prison guard was multiplied to a troop of 25. Along with him, Antonio Delgado, Carlos Díaz, Victoriano Saldaña, Manuel Aponte, Agustín de Soto, Carbabal, and Vicente Ximenez were held. Marcano was left in charge of the prisoners. Brenes provided medicines to ensure that the pirates survived long enough to stand trial. While the mayor was overseeing his treatment, Cofresí held a reunion with him, offering the sum of 4,000 pesos (31.25 pounds of silver) for his liberty. However, the mayor declined and promptly reported the event. Six militiamen guarded the pirates until their transfer to San Juan, Puerto Rico could be approved. Two more pirates, Juan Carlos de Torres and Juan Manuel de Fuentes, were caught on March 7, 1825. Both were injured, although the former carried with him some money, razors, ammunition and a faux pearl necklace. Two days later, Marcano was assigned to escort Cofresí and other of his pirates to the mayor's mansion. During his journey through the Cordillera Central, he was carried on a stretcher while still recovering from his injuries. In each town, the task of carrying him was assigned to a new party of eight militiamen. The party was heavily guarded due to fears that associates or civilian sympathizers may set Cofresí free, a concern expressed by Brenes when communicating with the other mayors. The final members of his crew were caught during the following weeks. On March 11, 1825, José Rodríguez was caught while being harbored by two corrupt militiamen. Ten days later the last member of the crew, a former slave named Carlos, was arrested while hiding in a hacienda. At the moment of this arrest, he was carrying 2.5 ounces (70.9 g) of gold.

=== Trial and execution ===
On March 6, 1825, San José y las Animas towed Anne to the Ponce port. As news of the incident spread fast, the ship's arrival was met by a large congregation of spectators, among whom were several local officers. The Spanish authorities tried to host Pendergrast for a celebration, but he declined the offer, noting that he had orders to return to St. Thomas with Anne as soon as it was captured. The lieutenant was only in port enough time to deal with bureaucratic processes and help move the cannons. Despite this, the authorities staffed his vessel with provisions and replaced the spent ammunition.

Pendergrast and the American marines were transported to St. Thomas during this trip. The group systematically examined the coasts during their journey, but failed to locate more pirates. On March 11, 1825, San José y las Animas arrived at St. Thomas port, where the crew met Sloat and notified him of Cofresí's capture. The following morning, the results were notified to the Secretary of the Navy and to governor Von Scholten. Sloat then gathered the witness accounts of Pastoriza and Low, which were sent along with the official report to the United States, where Porter faced trial for illegally invading Fajardo. On March 13, 1825, Low gave an account of Anne's hijacking off St. Thomas as part of his attempt to recover his ship. Shortly afterwards, Grampus set sail to San Juan. There, Sloat offered De la Torre the testimony of his men, but the governor noted that Cofresí and his crew were already guilty by default, having never denied that they were pirates. The captain then visited the pirate in his cell, asking if he had taken any American vessels, to which he answered that he would have done so had an opportunity arisen.

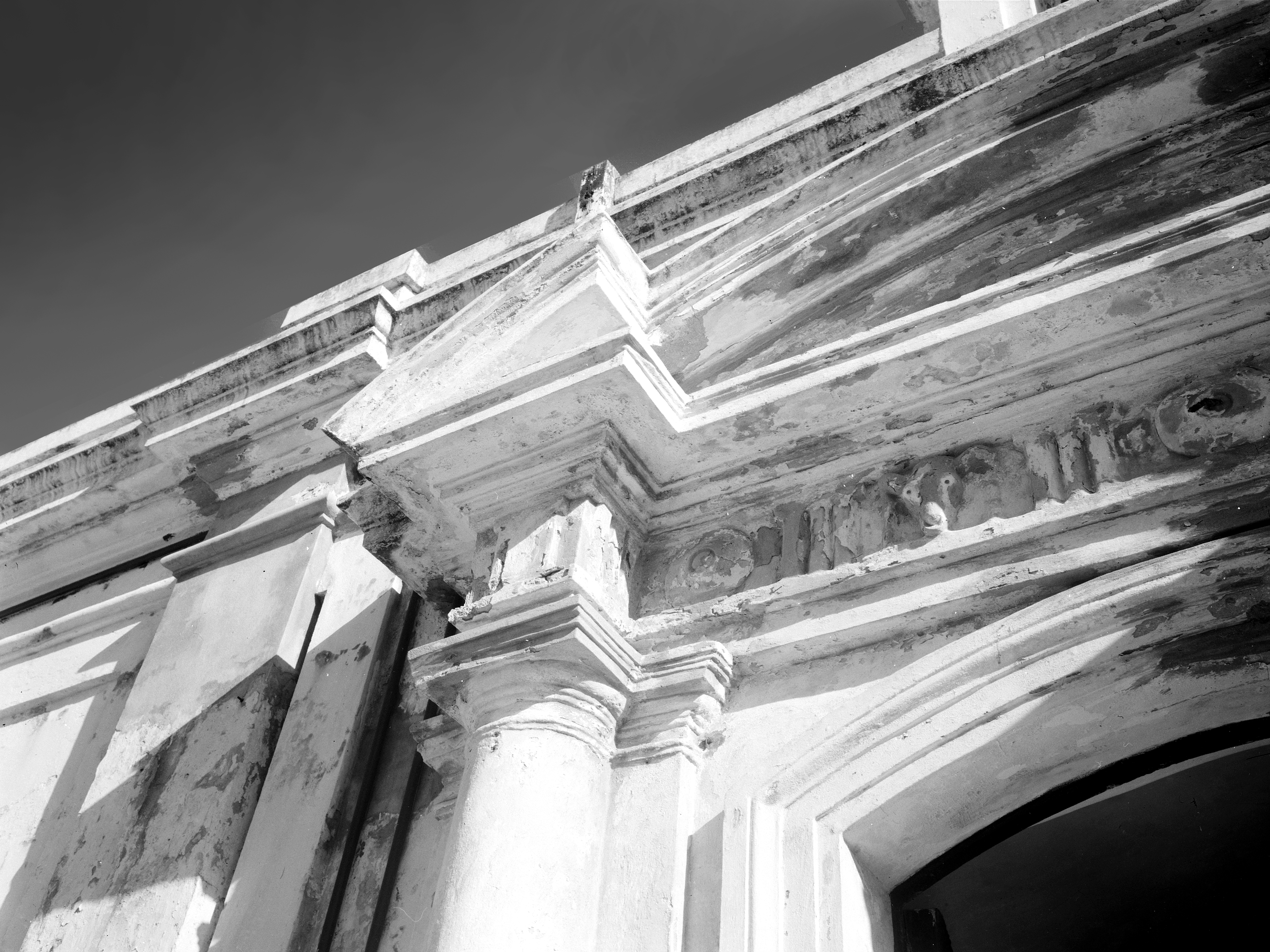
The exterior of Castillo San Felipe del Morro's chapel

On March 17, 1825, the authorities began a military trial against Cofresí and ten of his cohorts. Due to measures enacted by governor De la Torre, any trial for piracy could only be resolved as a case of foreign privateering, thus preventing a civilian case. That same day the interrogation of Cofresí took place, overseen by prosecutor José Madrazo. According to the government's gazette, the pirate confessed to the capture of a French sloop, a Danish schooner, a small boat from St. Thomas, a brigantine and schooner from the Dominican Republic, an American schooner and two local vessels. As the process was beginning, Sloat returned to Grampus and set sail. That same day, the French frigate La Ninfa and schooner Gazelle reached port. Like Sloat before them, the French officers visited De la Torre and the pirates. Half a dozen additional accomplices were caught and transported to the prison during this period.

On March 27, 1825, the military trial determined that the sentence for their transgression was death, the first time that a purely local process (held at San Juan without the consent of the West Indies Council) had led to this verdict for the crime of piracy. The military also felt that this minimized the budget of the process and prevented overpopulation in the jail, something that would be expected given the quantity of associates which helped the pirates. The only exception was Carlos, who was assigned to a slavery auction. The day before the execution, the pirates were granted their final wish and were confessed by Catholic priests. Wanting to make an example of Cofresí, the government placed proclamations throughout the city. On March 29, 1825, the pirates were allowed to go to attend a mass at El Morro's chapel while the Granada Infantry Battalion prepared the grounds. Cofresí was then escorted to the execution grounds before a large crowd, where he was blindfolded. After one last act of defiance from their captain, the pirates were executed by a firing squad. News of the event was published in the local government's gazette, along with a warning for anyone interested in piracy. The press of the United States heavily publicized these events, while Porter's trial continued. However, despite arguing that Fajardo had turned into a pirate's nest and that the complicity of the authorities made them enemies, Porter was found guilty and in turn resigned his commission and defected.

=== Long term repercussions ===
Since Cofresí's contacts extended throughout the west, south and east coasts of Puerto Rico, the authorities continued investigating and arresting people that were considered to have been associates of the pirates. There were so many linked to Cofresí, that this process extended for more than a decade. Due to their connections, both of his brothers were jailed between 1824 and 1826. The sudden disappearance of Neptune gathered the attention of the authorities, and shortly after the capture of the pirates, a similar vessel sailing under the name Neptuno was traced sailing alongside a schooner named María, property of Pedro Alacán. This man had collaborated with the authorities in several of its incursions against Cofresí, including a highly publicized mission to Mona on June 22, 1824. For his work in this operation and lending his sloop Avispa (which was reportedly lost in a storm during the voyage), Alacán received a military recognition and was restituted with a pirate vessel confiscated at Mona. However, as soon as a connection to the fate of Neptune was established, he was arrested along with other members of that foray. The reason behind the contradictory actions of Alacán following the mission at Mona and his subsequent association with Cofresí remain unclear. Among the possibilities explored by historian Walter Cardona Bonet are that Avispa was never lost, but given to the pirates, and that his involvement in the mission was to ensure that they escaped. It is likely that the association with Alacán began after Juan Francisco was arrested, with his taking over the distribution of contraband.

During his time in jail, Saldaña confessed the location of Del Rosario, De la Rosa and Pizarro. De la Torre ordered an expedition to Vieques to capture them. However, the mission failed, with Ramos offering haven to two of the pirates. Manuel Ramos, a cousin of De los Reyes, had provided refuge and protection from the authorities. Del Rosario Centeno was not on the island by this time, instead hiding at Naguabo. De los Reyes was later arrested at the same location during the summer of 1825. Pizarro was also believed to hide here or at the adjacent property of another associate named Guillermo Opio, eventually moving to Africa to work in slave trading. Merchant Juan de Arce was also captured in Naguabo after his figure was linked to Cofresí by the military commander of Vieques, Antonio Roselló, who identified that one of his ships was in service of the pirates. José Salvador Pardo Figueroa and Manuel Ximénez were also brought from Vieques as suspects.

De la Rosa was arrested during this period. Jaime Márquez escaped to St. Thomas, where he was pursued for planning a mutiny aboard the Spanish schooner Dorada and arrested in December 1825 for stealing the sloop L'Amadea. Juan Geraldo Bey was sought after as a pirate for his association with Cofresí, remaining fugitive until January 1826. Ramos was captured at Vieques on October 13, 1826, after allegedly trying to recruit sailors for piracy. Juan Peña, the former captain of María, was arrested as an accomplice of the pirates in February 1827, this despite not being involved in the incident with Neptune. Parallel to this, Del Rosario was arrested for other crimes, dying while serving his sentence. During the following years, a number of associates were arrested and died in jail including Juan Ramos, Juan Gufao, José Correa, Antonio Carreras and Manuel Ramos. Another suspect, José del Rosario died in jail for another crime before he could be prosecuted for his association with Cofresí. Reyes Paz and Gallardo escaped Puerto Rico and boarded a slaver's ship at St. Thomas, but they were discovered and sent to San Juan, where they were subjected to trial. Morales Hernández remained fugitive until 1839, when he was caught in Naguabo and executed with the garrote.

== Official recounts and media coverage ==
=== Sloat's report ===
The American version states that Commander Sloat solicited permission for the use of two small ships after becoming aware of Cofresí's latest actions. After becoming acquainted with Cofresí, John Low was brought in along the crew. The report claims that Sloat was aware of an evasion strategy that was used by the pirates to escape when pursued by large ships, which consisted of traveling as close to the coast as possible in small draft vessels, thereby avoiding being followed. Therefore, he used the small ships in order to pursue them while attempting this strategy. Both vessels were armed and began working in an exploratory manner, traveling through several ports and coastal towns. On the third day while sailing near Ponce, Dolphin located a ship in Boca del Infierno and identified it as Anne. When Cofresí saw the ship, he confused it with a merchant vessel, since it was not flying its actual colors, and ordered his crew to attack. Armed with a four-pounder cannon, Anne approached the ship, but the crew revealed that it was a military vessel by hoisting the Navy jack and opened fire. The subsequent exchange lasted forty-five minutes and ended when the pirates abandoned their ship and swam to the nearby beach. Vicente Antoneti, who was traveling in Bautista Pierety's boat, disembarked and notified the local Spanish military unit about the event. Two of the pirates died in the battle and six others, including Cofresí, were injured. Sloat estimated that Cofresí had lost a third of his crew in the previous exchange, based on the number of bodies on the water surrounding the boat. Aboard Anne they found several muskets, guns, cutlasses and knives. The sloop was then sailed towards St. Thomas, arriving there by March 11, 1825. Cofresí was ultimately caught after receiving a blunderbuss injury to his left arm and was subdued with a hit from a carbine's stock.

=== Renovales' report ===
Most of the discrepancies between the Spanish account and Sloat's report originate from colonel Renovales of the Southern District's Command, who issued his report after personally hosting Pendergrast. On March 1, 1825, the mayor of Guayama was informed that a suspicious sloop was anchoring at Boca del Infierno. According to this version, Renovales himself requested the service of three vessels the following day. The most notable boats of this excursion were San José y Las Animas, loaned for the mission, and Grampus, which belonged to the United States. According to the officer, the strategy to capture the pirates was developed by José Ortíz de la Renta, the mayor of the municipality of Ponce, and himself. The mayor is also credited with the initiative of recruiting Sloat to command the reconnaissance mission. Renovales uses the Spanish name of both ships in its report, also stating that lieutenant Pendergrast was not in command of San José y las Animas. Renovales also claims Centeno as the owner of Anne, without mention of Low. Three American officers and a doctor accompanied Sloat in this mission. Pendergrast, George A. Magrades and Francis Store plus a crew of twenty-three sailors were assigned to the mission. The sailors were heavily armed and a new cannon was mounted on the ship. On the afternoon of the third day one of the ships located Cofresí, near the entrance of Boca del Infierno. When the pirates spotted the vessel San José y Las Animas, they confused it with a merchant ship and proceeded to attack it. The crew of the ship hid until the pirates were within shooting distance, when they opened fire. Both vessels exchanged cannon fire. Cofresí commanded Ana to go near land, but was forced to disembark in the coast and to retreat into a nearby forestal area.

Later that day the mayor of the town of Los Jobos issued a statement which detailed the pirates' entrance into the beach, and he subsequently notified the local authorities about the event. A search operation was launched and during the dusk hours six pirates were captured. The Spanish government then sent military personnel to block all the roads and plains surrounding the area. Two of the search groups believed that the pirates would have to pass through a certain road in order to escape and planned to ambush them there. The pirates reached the location at 10:30 p.m. and tried to escape, but were intercepted. According to Renovales, Manuel Sánchez de Ortiz and a group of militiamen found Cofresí and two cohorts near Patillas that night. Cofresí tried to defend himself with a knife, but his injury facilitated their capture. Juan Garay is still credited for disabling his arm with the blunderbuss during their confrontation. His injuries were severe, but a doctor declared that they were not lethal. The rest of the crew was captured by the police departments of Patillas and Guayama on March 7 and 8. The names of the known crewmembers are Juan Carlos de Torres and Santiago Díaz. Both men exhibited recent gun wounds, with the former still carrying fifteen Spanish coins, handkerchiefs, two faux pearl necklaces, a list written in English, two earrings, two razors and three bullets, among other things.

=== Press accounts ===
Details of the trials were suppressed locally, with only the government's La Gaceta de Puerto Rico publishing its account. This result was highly suspicious due to the Caribbean press' high interest in piracy, suggesting a media blackout or coverup. Despite this, the United States press quickly acted to propagate its knowledge of the case in order to influence the Porter trial, since he justified his invasion by claiming that Puerto Rico had become a Government-sanctioned pirate's nest. By April, newspapers such as The Maryland Gazette were reprinting the government's account of the events. On May 28, 1825, the Gaceta de Madrid published an article where De la Torre is quoted praising the local effort and noting the "sleepless nights" that were spent due to "[his] government's interest" to "exterminate [the pirates]."

In 1846, Boston Traveller reporter Freeman Hunt elaborates and recounts that upon landing ashore, Cofresí employed sly tactics to avoid the soldiers, first exploiting the chaos to evade the cavalry and then stealing the clothes and animals from a herdsman. The pirate then hid in plain sight by directing the herd towards the soldiers and scattering them away by providing false information about the location of his crew while unrecognized. Hunt notes that Cofresí was close to escaping, but a child present at the last guard post recognized him due to bilateral syndactyly, forcing him to run and be wounded by a shot to the neck. Despite bleeding, the pirate recovered quickly and unfurled his knife, gaining an upper hand until more soldiers were attracted by the noise. One of them hit Cofresí with the stock of a carbine, taking advantage that he was still struggling with the first. His hands were then bound and his feet were fastened to a horse. Hunt claims that despite his injuries, Cofresí was placed in iron handcuffs and that a soldier was assigned to his bedside. Other unusual precautions were reportedly taken due to his reputation, including the doubling of guards throughout the prison and an "officer [being] made responsible with his head for the [fate] of the prisoner". Hunt states that during this arrest the pirate narrated his life, explained his motivations and also boasted about his athletic capacity by claiming to have been "the most active man" and "best runner on the island".

In 1923, Francis B. C. Bradlee provided a different account of the events, crediting Sloat with the capture of Anne. The journalist claims that a different crew served aboard the merchant sloop, with Andrew Hull Foote acting as midship-man along 23 sailors. Bradlee mentions that Cofresí opened fire and that Sloat ordered the counterattack with a twelve-pound carronade. The report correctly quotes the 45-minute exchange, that left two of the pirates dead and the grounding of Anne. The journalist also expresses his amusement that ten of the pirates were captured by the Spanish. Bradlee concluded his account erroneously, stating that Cofresí was executed with the garrote.

== See also ==
- Capture of the schooner Fancy
- Capture of the sloop William
- Capture of Manuel Briones
