= David McLane (merchant) =

- Born: 1767; Providence, Colony of Rhode Island, British America
- Died: 21 July 1797 (aged 30); Quebec City, Lower Canada, British North America
- Cause of death: Execution by hanging

David McLane (c. 1767 – 21 July 1797), also sometimes referred to as David McLean or David M'Lane, was a merchant from Providence, Rhode Island. He was hanged at Quebec City as a French spy by the British authorities.

== Biography ==
Little is known of McLane's life. He may have been born in Ayrshire, Scotland, and has been described as "an insolvent architect-merchant."

McLane was accused of attempting to organize a surprise attack on the garrison at Quebec City based on testimony of a number of witnesses, including William Barnard and John Black. At the time, Great Britain was expecting trouble in its colonies because many colonists were expressing support for the ideals of the French Revolution. McLane was arrested at Black's home in Quebec City. Despite the fact that McLane was not a resident of Canada and that some of the testimony given against him may not have been credible, in July 1797 he was found guilty of treason by a jury and sentenced to suffer a traitors death of being hanged, drawn and quartered. He was hanged outside the walls of the town, then decapitated and disembowelled. McLane was about thirty years old at the time of his death. The American government chose to ignore the affair in order to maintain relations with Great Britain.
