= USS Grampus (1821) =

Coordinates: 32.625°N 79.725°W

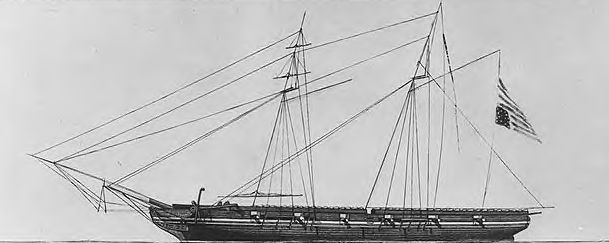
- Grampus depicted flying her National Ensigns upside down, a sign of distress

History

United States
- Name: USS Grampus
- Builder: Washington Navy Yard
- Laid down: 1820
- Launched: August 1821
- Stricken: 1 August 1843
- Fate: Foundered, 15 March 1843

General characteristics
- Type: Schooner
- Displacement: 171.5 long tons (174.3 t)
- Length: 97 ft (30 m)
- Beam: 23 ft 6 in (7.16 m)
- Draft: 9 ft 6 in (2.90 m)
- Propulsion: Sail
- Complement: 142 officers and enlisted
- Armament: 2 × 9 pdr (4.1 kg) guns, 8 × 24 pdr (11 kg) carronades

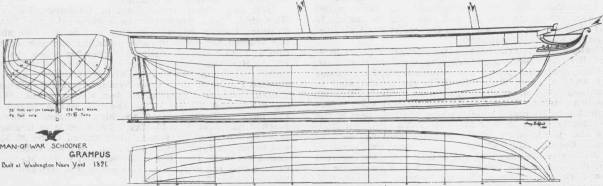
Plans of USS Grampus

USS Grampus was a schooner in the United States Navy. She was the first U.S. Navy ship to be named for the Grampus griseus, also known as Risso's dolphin.

Grampus was built at the Washington Navy Yard under the supervision of naval constructor William Doughty, based on a design by Henry Eckford. Her 73 ft (22 m) keel was laid down in 1820. She was launched in early August 1821. The need to suppress piracy and to maintain ships to catch slavers led to the building of five such schooners, the largest of which was Grampus. This was the first building program undertaken by the Navy since the War of 1812.

== Service history ==
Lieutenant Francis Gregory commanded Grampus on her first cruise as part of the West Indies Squadron, which took her to the Antilles in pursuit of pirates. In the company of Hornet, Enterprise, Spark, Porpoise, and Shark, Grampus engaged in convoying merchant vessels throughout 1821, the presence of the squadron having a marked effect on piratical activity among the islands.

On 16 August 1822, Grampus fought a brig flying Spanish colors, but which Lt. Gregory suspected was a pirate. When he called upon her commander to surrender, he was met with cannon and small arms fire. Grampus answered in turn, and reduced the bogus Spaniard to a floating wreck in 3 1/2 minutes. The brig struck her colors and Lt. Gregory discovered that she was Palmyra, a Puerto Rico-based pirate carrying the papers of a privateer as a subterfuge. Lloyd's List named the privateer as Panchetta, of 18 guns and 92 men. The privateer had suffered 11 men killed.

In 1825, Captain John D. Sloat — commander of Grampus — engaged another Puerto Rican pirate, Roberto Cofresí, in battle. Cofresí was captured along with eleven members of his crew, and they were turned over to the Spanish government. Cofresí was jailed in El Castillo del Morro in San Juan.

Grampus had a small part in the Amistad trials: in November–December 1839, the U.S. government had Grampus standing by in New Haven Harbor, so that if the court ruled in favor of the slaves' Spanish "owners," they could deport the Africans to Cuba before they could file an appeal. However, the district judge ruled that the Africans had been illegally enslaved and must be returned to Africa. It was the government that appealed on behalf of the slaveholders, and Grampus was not needed.

Grampus continued her duties in the protection of shipping in the Caribbean Sea and in the South Atlantic Ocean until August 1841, when she was detached from the Africa Squadron while lying at Boston Navy Yard and attached to the Home Squadron at Norfolk, Virginia on 23 January 1843.

Grampus was last spoken to by Madison off St. Augustine, Florida on 15 March 1843. She is presumed to have foundered in a gale off Charleston, South Carolina with all hands.
