= USS Superior (1814) =

United States Navy frigate

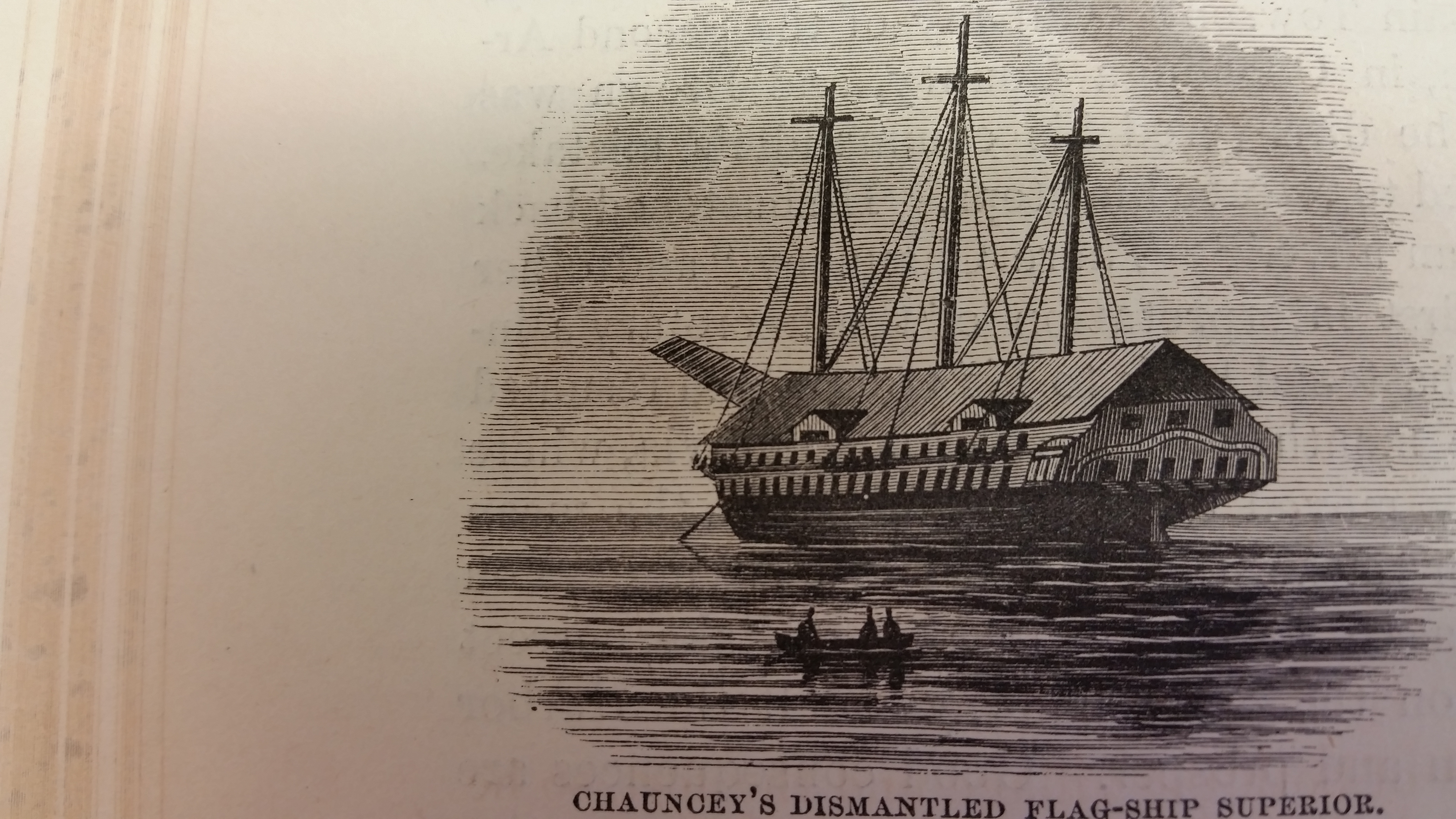
- USS Superior

History

United States
- Name: USS Superior
- Builder: Henry Eckford, Sackets Harbor, New York
- Laid down: February 1814
- Launched: 2 May 1814
- Fate: Sold sometime before 1824

General characteristics
- Type: Frigate
- Tonnage: 1580
- Propulsion: Sail
- Complement: 500 officers and enlisted
- Armament: 30 × medium Columbiads 32-pounder guns; 2 × long 24-pounder guns; 26 × 42-pounder carronades

USS Superior was built for the War of 1812, and was named after one of the Great Lakes. Superior was a U.S. Navy frigate built in 1814 at Sackets Harbor, New York, by Henry Eckford, and was laid down in February 1814 and launched on 2 May of the same year.

== Operations on Lake Ontario ==
Built for service in Commodore Isaac Chauncey's squadron on Lake Ontario, Superior was commanded by Lt. John H. Elton. She joined the squadron in late July off the English base at Kingston, Ontario. The frigate operated there through the summer as Chauncey blockaded Kingston, hoping to lure Sir James Yeo's fleet out for a decisive action.

Late in September, Superior helped transport General Izzard and some 3,000 troops from Sackets Harbor to Genesee, New York. She returned briefly to Kingston before sailing back to Sackets Harbor for the winter.

== Post-war deactivation ==
Before warm weather returned, peace ended naval operations on Lake Ontario. Superior was laid up at Sackets Harbor and sold sometime before 1824.
