= Ralph Gray (politician) =

Canadian politician

Ralph Gray (c 1740 – December 27, 1813) was a seigneur, businessman and political figure in Lower Canada.

He was born during or before 1740, probably in Scotland, and came to North America during the Seven Years' War, serving in Major-General Jeffery Amherst's troops. Gray was a regimental tailor and was a Private and later as Sergeant in the British Army. He was wounded at the Battle of the Plains of Abraham. After the war, he set up shop as a tailor in the town of Quebec. Some time afterwards, he married Mary Ann Scott. In 1774, he purchased the sub-fief of Grandpré from William Grant. Gray expanded into importing and opened a wholesale outlet. He retired from business in 1778. In 1789, he became part-owner of a toll bridge over the Saint-Charles River and sold land in Lower Town to John Black. Gray was a shareholder of the Union Hotel at Quebec. In 1808, he was elected to the Legislative Assembly of Lower Canada for Quebec; he was reelected in 1809. He opposed measures taken to declare Pierre-Amable de Bonne ineligible to sit in the assembly after de Bonne became a judge. In 1810, Gray married Phoebe Wallen, the widow of James Frost, after the death of his first wife. They separated in 1813.

He died at Beauport in 1813.
