= 103rd Regiment of Foot (1806) =

9th Garrison Battalion 103rd Regiment of Foot
- Active: 25 November 1806—24 October 1817
- Country: United Kingdom
- Branch: British Army
- Type: Line Infantry
- Size: Battalion/Regiment
- HQ in Canada: Quebec Citadell
- Nicknames: "The Boys Regiment" "Worst Regiment in Canada"
- Engagements: Napoleonic Wars; Home Defence; War of 1812; Salmon River Raid; Battle of Lundy's Lane; Siege of Fort Erie; Niagara Campaign

The 103rd Regiment of Foot was a line infantry unit of the British Army. Though only existing for just over 10 years, the regiment would see more action than most of its 100-series regiments.

== Service ==
=== Formation ===
On 25 November 1806, the 9th Garrison Battalion was formed in Enniskillen from limited service men drafted from: 2nd Btn, 28th (North Gloucestershire) Regiment of Foot, 1st Btn, 30th (Cambridgeshire) Regiment of Foot, 2nd Btn, 47th (Lancashire) Regiment of Foot, 2nd Btn, 48th (Northamptonshire) Regiment of Foot, and 2nd Btn, 71st (Glasgow Highland) Regiment of Foot. In 1807, the battalion served in Ireland on garrison duties until December 1808 when it was redesignated as the 103rd Regiment of Foot after the limited service men were discharged and others re-enlisted for general service.

=== War of 1812 ===
In 1813, the regiment was shipped overseas to the Canadian Frontier, and was garrisoned in Quebec City, where it took part in the War of 1812. During the 1812 war, the flank companies (Grenadier and Light Infantry) saw service at notable battles, including Patteron's Creek, Lundy's Lane, the Siege of Fort Erie and the Niagara Campaign. For its participation, the regiment was awarded the battle honours "Canadian Frontier" and "Niagara".

During its tenure in Canada the regiment became known as "The Worst regiment in Canada", mostly due to the high desertion rate, very young recruits, and poor discipline. The nickname was given by the Governor General of Canada, George Prevost. However, this nickname was not well taken, and the regiment was able to prove its worth by gaining a battle honour.

==== Lundy's Lane ====
The Battle of Lundy's Lane, which the regiment fought in

During the Battle of Lundy's Lane, the line companies of the regiment formed part of the First Brigade under Colonel Hercules Scott, at Twelve Mile Creek, while the flank companies were part of the Third (Light) Brigade under Lieutenant Colonel Thomas Pearson, encamped near Four Mile Creek.

During the battle, the regiment melted away after a couple of American volleys. However, they were rallied by the extraordinary exertions of Major William Smelt. After another desperate assault, the British succeeded in forcing their way into the battery. Fearing the capture of the guns, Major Jacob Hindman spiked two cannons.

==== Fort Erie ====
During the Siege of Fort Erie an attack column of 700 men, led by Colonel Scott, attacked the northern portion of the American lines. After making several attempts to capture the lines, though suffering heavy casualties and their location being given away by forward pickets, the attack column fell back. After this failed assault, the regiment moved westward to join the third assault column, which was on their right.

During the assault of the third column, the assault was again held off, with many of the remaining men joining Drummond's column, which was in the process of attacking Douglass Battery. Yet another attack was ordered, and the sailors and marines of the column made it past the breastworks, but after a volley and bayonet charge by the 19th U.S. Infantry Regiment, they were yet again forced back and rallied, after just a few minutes.

During the siege, the regiment's commanding officer, Colonel Scott was killed. In addition, the regiment suffered about 424 casualties, including 14 out of 18 officers. Before the siege, the regiment had been based in Burlington.

=== Disbandment ===
In 1815, the regiment was still in Canada when it was reduced to six companies after personnel were drafted to other regiments. In 1817, the regiment arrived back in the United Kingdom, and on 24 October 1817 was finally disbanded while in Chelmsford.

== Uniform ==
The regiment's uniform consisted of a scarlet jacket with white facings.

== Colonels ==
The regimental colonels included:

- 25 November 1806 – 25 June 1808: General Sir Brent Spencer, GCB (also Colonel of the Rifle Brigade and 2nd West India Regiment)
- 25 June 1808 – 1812: Lieutenant General Sir Samuel Auchmuty, GCB (also Colonel of the 78th (Highlander) Regiment of Foot, and Commander-in-Chief, Madras from 1810 to 1813)
- 1812–12 January 1814: Gen The Honourable Sir Galbraith Lowry Cole, GCB (also Colonel of the 70th (Surrey) Regiment of Foot)
- 12 January 1814 – 24 October 1817: Lt Gen George Porter
