= Mulcaster =

Mulcaster is a surname. Notable people with the surname include:

- G. H. Mulcaster (1891–1964), British actor
- Richard Mulcaster (c.1531–1611), English headmaster, lexicographer and priest
- William Mulcaster (1783–1837), British Royal Navy officer
- Wynona Mulcaster (1915–2016), Canadian painter
