= Eleazer W. Ripley =

American politician

Eleazer Wheelock Ripley
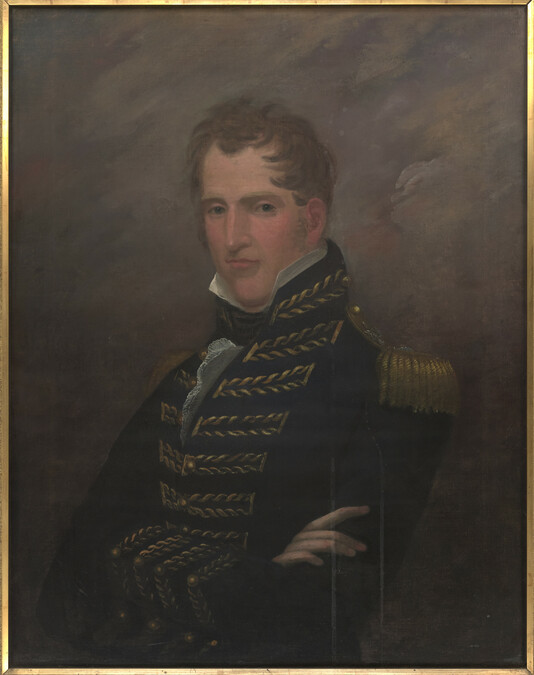

Member of the U.S. House of Representatives from Louisiana's 2nd district
- In office March 4, 1835 – March 2, 1839
- Preceded by: Philemon Thomas
- Succeeded by: Thomas Withers Chinn

Member of the Louisiana Senate
- In office 1832

Member of the Massachusetts Senate
- In office 1812

Speaker of the Massachusetts House of Representatives
- In office 1812
- Preceded by: Joseph Story
- Succeeded by: Timothy Bigelow

Member of the Massachusetts House of Representatives
- In office 1807–1812

Personal details
- Born: April 15, 1782 Hanover, New Hampshire
- Died: March 2, 1839 (aged 56) West Feliciana Parish, Louisiana
- Resting place: Locust Grove Cemetery; St. Francisville, Louisiana
- Party: Democratic
- Spouse: Love Allen (m. 1811 - 1820)
- Relations: James W. Ripley (brother)
- Children: 2
- Education: Dartmouth College
- Awards: Congressional Gold Medal

Military service
- Allegiance: United States
- Branch/service: United States Army
- Years of service: 1812–1820
- Rank: Brigadier General; Brevet Major General
- Battles/wars: War of 1812; Battle of York; Battle of Sackett's Harbor; Battle of Crysler's Farm; Battle of Lundy's Lane; Siege of Fort Erie

Eleazer Wheelock Ripley (April 15, 1782 – March 2, 1839) was an American attorney, soldier, and politician who was the U.S. representative for Louisiana's 2nd congressional district from 1835 until 1839. He was previously a member of both the Massachusetts and Louisiana state legislatures and served as a Brigadier General in the War of 1812.

== Biography ==
Ripley was born in Hanover, New Hampshire on April 15, 1782, to Abigail and Reverend Sylvanus Ripley. His ancestor Ralph Wheelock arrived to Massachusetts Bay Colony from England around 1636 during the Great Migration. His mother was the daughter of Eleazar Wheelock, the founder of Dartmouth College and his maternal uncle was John Wheelock, the college's president. His father was a professor of divinity at Dartmouth in the 1780s. Ripley later attended Dartmouth, graduating in 1800.

After being admitted to the bar Ripley moved to Kennebec County, Maine, and Portland, Maine where he began his law practice. He served in the Massachusetts House of Representatives from 1810 to 1811 and was elected to the Massachusetts Senate in 1812.

In August 1812, following the outbreak of the War of 1812, he organized the 21st United States Infantry Regiment, and was given the rank of lieutenant-colonel. He was promoted to colonel in March 1813. Most of the regiment's soldiers came from Massachusetts and Maine. Soldiers from the regiment took part in several battles, including York (in which Ripley was wounded), Sacketts Harbor, Crysler's Farm.

In April 1814, Ripley was promoted to Brigadier General. (Lieutenant Colonel James Miller, late of the 4th US Infantry Regiment was appointed to succeed him in command of the 21st Infantry.) Ripley was appointed to command the Second Brigade (which included the 21st Infantry) of Major General Jacob Brown's Left Division on the Niagara River. At the Battle of Lundy's Lane, Ripley's brigade captured and held the British guns until the American withdrawal. However, he was blamed by Brown for losing the guns during the withdrawal and later demanded a court martial to clear his name.

Ripley briefly commanded Brown's division during the Siege of Fort Erie after Brown was wounded at Lundy's Lane, but was superseded by Brigadier General Edmund Pendleton Gaines. He was conspicuous in the repulse of a British assault on August 16, and in an American sortie on September 17, in which he was wounded.

Ripley was awarded the Congressional Gold Medal, the precursor to the Medal of Honor, for his wartime service. He moved to Baton Rouge, Louisiana, in 1825, and left the army in 1820 to continue his career in politics. He served in the Louisiana State Senate in 1832. He served as a United States representative from Louisiana's Second District from March 4, 1835, to March 2, 1839.

He was the subject of a United States Supreme Court decision, United States v. Ripley (1832). As a result of this decision, Ripley owed the United States a sum of money that he had expended while serving as a Major General by brevet. The building involved in the lawsuit is the oldest building in Uptown New Orleans.

== Legacy ==
Ripley's efforts during the war were recognized by the renaming of village of Staunton, Ohio, to Ripley, Ohio, in his honor. The military facilities Fort Ripley and Camp Ripley were also named in his honor. Other places named after him include Ripley County, Indiana; Ripley County, Missouri; Ripley, New York; Ripley, Tennessee; Ripley, Mississippi and Fort Ripley, Minnesota.

== See also ==
- List of members of the United States Congress who died in office (1790–1899)

U.S. House of Representatives
Preceded by Philemon Thomas	Member of the U.S. House of Representatives from Louisiana's 2nd congressional district 1835 – 1839	Succeeded by Thomas Withers Chinn
