= John Parker Boyd =

American military officer (1764–1830)

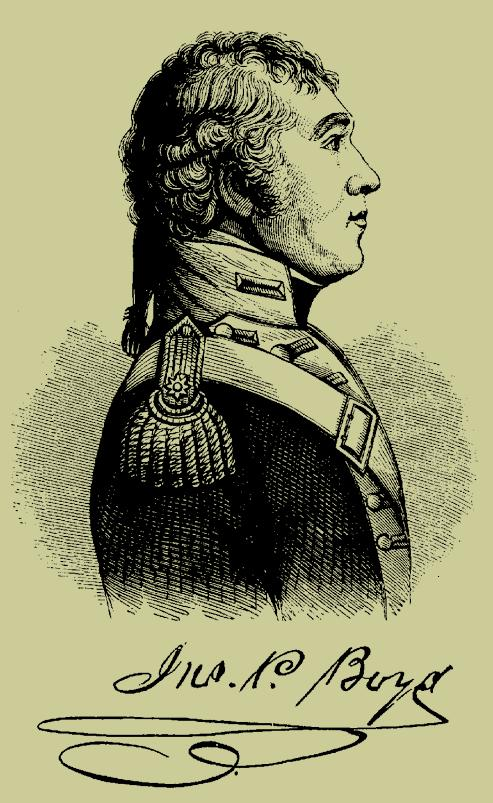
- John Parker Boyd, American Brigadier General in the War of 1812
- Born: December 21, 1764; Newburyport, Massachusetts Bay, British America
- Died: October 4, 1830 (aged 65); Boston, Massachusetts, US
- Burial place: Christ Church Cemetery, Boston, Massachusetts, US
- Military career
- Allegiance: United States; Maratha Empire; Hyderabad State
- Branch: United States Army
- Service years: 1786-1789; 1808–1815
- Rank: Brigadier General
- Commands: 4th Infantry Regiment
- Conflicts: Shays' Rebellion; Battle of Kharda; War of 1812
- Other work: Soldier of Fortune; Businessman; Naval Officer of the Port of Boston

John Parker Boyd (December 21, 1764 – October 4, 1830) was an officer in the United States Army at various periods from 1786 to the end of the War of 1812. He attained the rank of brigadier general and led the command during the Battle of Crysler's Farm.

== Early life ==
Boyd was born in Newburyport, Massachusetts, on December 21, 1764, he was of paternal Scottish and maternal English (British) roots.

Too young to serve at the time in the American Revolution, but decided upon a military career nonetheless, he served in the militia and joined the American Army as an Ensign in 1786.

He served in the force sent to counter the Shays' Rebellion, and resigned after three years in the Army to serve as a Soldier of Fortune in Central India. In 1793, Boyd was contracted by Ahilyabai Holkar to raise a battalion of infantry based on a European model, and later raised two more battalions of soldiers for Baji Rao II. In 1795, he led a force of 1,800 men in the Battle of Kharda, fighting on the side of the Nizam of Hyderabad. Boyd was a highly successful cavalry commander, but was discharged in July 1798, due to his "refractoriness, disobedience, and unreasonableness."

== Return to the Army ==
Boyd continued to offer his services as a mercenary in India to the local kingdoms. After the British conquest ended the conflicts in which he had taken part, he disbanded his units, sold their equipment, and returned back to the United States.

Boyd rejoined the United States Army in October, 1808. Commissioned as Colonel of the 4th Infantry Regiment, during the Battle of Tippecanoe he served as a brigade commander and second-in-command to William Henry Harrison, with the rank of acting Brigadier General.

== War of 1812 ==
When the War of 1812 broke out, Boyd initially commanded a brigade under Major General Henry Dearborn in Albany, New York and in action in the area around Plattsburgh. He was promoted to permanent brigadier general in July.

In 1813, he successfully commanded a brigade at the Battle of Fort George. As illness or disgrace removed many of his contemporaries, he eventually commanded the garrison of captured Fort George. After a defeat at the Battle of Beaver Dams, Boyd's troops returned to Fort George and remained on the defensive.

Moving his troops from Fort George to Sacket's Harbor, he later participated in Major General James Wilkinson's ill-fated expedition to attack on Montreal (October, 1813). At the Battle of Crysler's Farm in November, 1813, the illness of Wilkinson and the army's second-in-command, Major General Morgan Lewis made Boyd the commander of the attack. His troops, poorly trained and dispirited from the rapid changes of command, straggled into action on unfavorable terrain. Boyd withdrew from the battle, allegedly under orders from either Wilkinson or Lewis, although later he could not recall who issued the order. Boyd lost control of the battle and was defeated. When the army retreated to French Mills, New York, Wilkinson sought to turn command over to Boyd. However, Wilkinson found an "insuperable repugnance" by other officers to serving under Boyd, and Wilkinson remained in command.

Boyd remained in command of a brigade in winter camp near French Mills. After a half-hearted attack by Wilkinson at Lacolle Mill failed, Wilkinson blamed Boyd, and Boyd was moved into a rear-area assignment. He saw no further combat service, and in 1816 he published a defense of his actions.

== Later life ==
After leaving the Army in 1815, Boyd was involved in several business ventures, often in partnership with his brothers Ebenezer, Robert and Joseph. (Boyd's brother Joseph was Maine's first Treasurer.) He was a founder of the Maine towns of Orneville and Medford.

In 1820 he was compensated by Britain for military services he had rendered in India.

Originally a Democratic-Republican, and later a Jacksonian and a Democrat, Boyd served as a member of the Boston Common Council in the 1820s. He was also active in civic causes, including the Scots Charitable Society.

In 1829 President Andrew Jackson appointed Boyd Naval Officer of the Port of Boston, replacing Thomas Melvill, and he served until his death. (At ports in the United States, it was the job of the Collector, Naval Officer and Surveyor to receive copies of manifests from newly arrived ships, provide permits and clearances for the off-loading of cargo, inspect ship contents, estimate the customs duty due, collect the duty, and send collections to the Treasury. They also fined ship and cargo owners who underestimated or attempted to avoid paying duties. The holders of these positions were paid a portion of the fees collected and fines levied, making them lucrative and sought after political appointments.)

== Death and burial ==
Boyd died in Boston on October 4, 1830. He was buried at Christ Church Cemetery in Boston.

== Family ==
Boyd never married, but according to his will and other sources is known to have had two children. One was a daughter named Frances, born in India on June 4, 1797, to an Indian Muslim woman named Housina. The other was a son named Wallace, born in October, 1814, was to a woman named Marie Rupell, a European-American woman. As indicated in his will, Boyd intended to leave a large portion of his estate to Housina and Frances, but they could not be located. Wallace received 25 percent of Boyd's estate. He later changed his name to John Wallace Boyd and became a ship's captain based in Boston.

== Legacy ==
Boyd Lake in Orneville township, Maine is named in honor for him.

In 2008, a Mississippi woman named Charlotte Dillard, had purchased at a Goodwill store in Georgia for slightly more than seven dollars an antique two-volume Bible inscribed "Symphonia A. Little presented by her uncle General Boyd." At the time of the purchase, Dillard planned to keep the books and display them at her home.

Boyd's name is included on Plaque 8 in Paul Revere Mall, listed among those from Boston's North End who played leadership roles in the American Revolution and War of 1812. (Paul Revere Mall is bounded by Hanover, Tileston, Unity and Charter Streets. It is a brick park with benches, a fountain and flowers. It includes numerous bronze plaques to commemorate various historical events and individuals, and features an equestrian statue of Paul Revere.)

=== Military reputation ===
Boyd's reputation as a commander is mixed. On one hand, he was praised for his skill, including his success in India. On the other, he was defeated at Crysler's Farm by a force only half the size of his. Winfield Scott clearly did not have high regard for Boyd, calling him amiable and respectable in a subordinate position but "vacillating and imbecile beyond all endurance as a chief under high responsibilities." Others have commended Boyd's military performance on specific occasions, including Tippecanoe and Fort George.
