= Thomas Pearson (British Army officer, born 1782) =

Lieutenant-General Sir Thomas Pearson KCB KCH
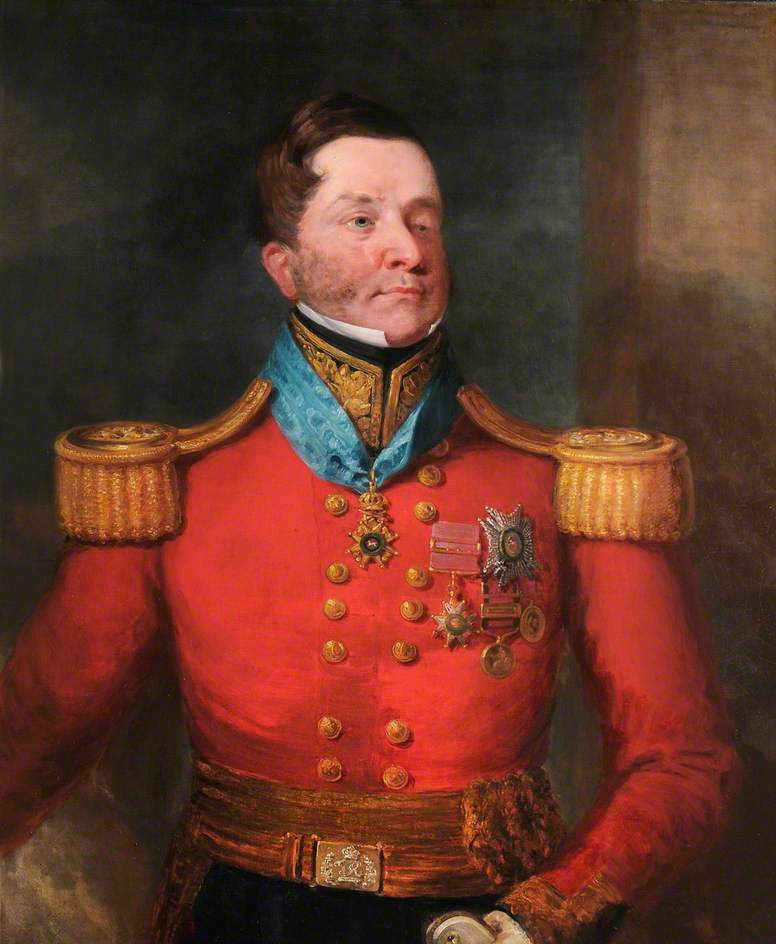
- Born: 1782; Somerset
- Died: 21 May 1847 (aged 64–65)
- Military career
- Allegiance: United Kingdom
- Branch: British Army
- Rank: Lieutenant-General
- Unit: Royal Welch Fusiliers
- Commands: French Revolutionary Wars; Anglo-Russian invasion of Holland; Egypt Campaign; Battle of Alexandria; Napoleonic Wars; Battle of Copenhagen; Invasion of Martinique; Peninsular War; Battle of Albuera; War of 1812; Battle of Crysler's Farm; Battle of Chippawa; Battle of Lundy's Lane; Siege of Fort Erie

Lieutenant-General Sir Thomas Pearson KCB KCH (1782 – 21 May 1847) was a British Army officer, who took part in the French Revolutionary Wars and Napoleonic Wars, and in the War of 1812 against the United States of America.

== Life ==
Pearson was born in Somerset. He served as an officer in the Royal Welch Fusiliers, in the Netherlands and in the Battle of Alexandria. Later, he fought at the Battle of Copenhagen (1807) and the capture of Martinique in 1809.

Transferred with his regiment to the Peninsular War, he was present at the Battle of Albuera in 1811, where he commanded the British light infantry. After the battle he temporarily commanded a brigade of Fusilier regiments. Later in the year he suffered a leg wound and returned to Britain on sick leave.

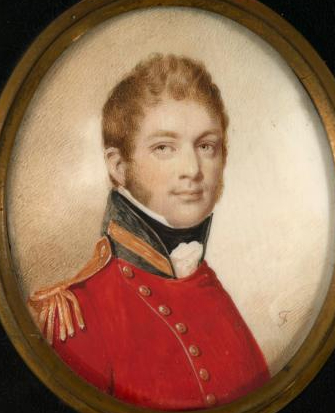
Lieutenant Colonel Thomas Pearson, 1811

Early in 1812, he was sent to Canada as Inspecting Field Officer of Militia. After the outbreak of war with America, Pearson was appointed Commandant of Fort Wellington at Prescott, in the middle of 1813. Late in the year, an American expedition under James Wilkinson passed by Prescott. Pearson attached part of his garrison to the pursuing British force under Lieutenant Colonel Morrison and led them at the decisive Battle of Crysler's Farm.

In 1814, Pearson led a detachment of light troops in the Niagara peninsula, and fought at the battles of Chippawa and Lundy's Lane, and in the Siege of Fort Erie, where he was wounded again.

After the end of the War, Pearson returned to command his regiment. He was knighted and promoted to major-general in 1833 and to lieutenant-general in 1841. He was given the colonelcy of the 85th Regiment of Foot (Bucks Volunteers) from 1843 to his death in 1847.
