= Andrew Gordon (British Army officer) =

British Army general

Lieutenant-General Andrew Gordon
- Died: 17 April 1806
- Military career
- Allegiance: (United Kingdom) Great Britain
- Branch: British Army
- Rank: Lieutenant-General
- Commands: Garrison of Jersey

Lieutenant-General Andrew Gordon (died 17 April 1806) was a British Army officer who became Lieutenant Governor of Jersey.

== Early life ==
He was a son of James Gordon of Ellon, Aberdeenshire and Elizabeth Glen, the latter being a sister of James Glen, governor of South Carolina. His brother was Lieutenant Colonel James Gordon.

== Military career ==
Born in Scotland, Gordon became a major in the 26th Regiment of Foot in 1777. He was promoted to lieutenant-colonel in 1784, colonel in 1790, major-general in 1794, and lieutenant-general in 1801 (from brevet, 1799). He was appointed Lieutenant Governor of Jersey in 1797 and died in office in 1806.

He was also Colonel of the 89th Regiment of Foot from 1795 to 1797, the 59th Regiment of Foot from 1797 to 1801 and Colonel of the 26th Regiment of Foot from 1801 to his death in 1806.

Military offices
Preceded by William Crosbie	Colonel of the 89th (The Princess Victoria's) Regiment of Foot; 1795–1797	Succeeded by Henry Bowyer
Preceded by Sir David Lindsay	Colonel of the 59th (2nd Nottinghamshire) Regiment of Foot; 1797–1801	Succeeded by Alexander Ross
Preceded by Sir Charles Stuart	Colonel of the 26th (Cameronian) Regiment of Foot; 1801–1806	Succeeded by The Lord Elphinstone
Government offices
Vacant	Lieutenant Governor of Jersey; 1797–1806	Succeeded by Sir George Don
