= 89th (Princess Victoria's) Regiment of Foot =

British Army infantry regiment

- Active: 1793–1881
- Country: Kingdom of Great Britain (1793–1800); United Kingdom (1801–1881)
- Branch: British Army
- Type: Infantry
- Size: One battalion (two battalions 1804–1816)
- Garrison/HQ: Gough Barracks, Armagh
- Engagements: French Revolutionary Wars; Napoleonic Wars; War of 1812; First Anglo-Burmese War; Crimean War; Indian Rebellion

Commanders
- Notable commanders: Joseph Morrison

The 89th (Princess Victoria's) Regiment of Foot was a regiment of the British Army, raised on 3 December 1793. Under the Childers Reforms the regiment amalgamated with the 87th (Royal Irish Fusiliers) Regiment of Foot to form the Princess Victoria's (Royal Irish Fusiliers) in 1881.

== History ==
=== Formation ===
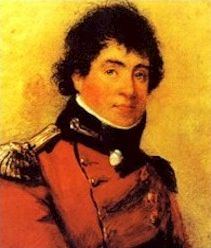
Lord Blayney who commanded the 2nd Battalion at the Battle of Fuengirola in October 1810

The regiment was raised in Dublin by Major-General William Crosbie as the 89th Regiment of Foot, in response to the threat posed by the French Revolution, on 3 December 1793. The regiment was sent to join the Duke of York's army in the Netherlands in summer 1794 as part of the unsuccessful defence of that country against the Republican French during the Flanders Campaign. It was posted to Ireland and, under the command of Lieutenant-Colonel Lord Blayney, it saw action at the Battle of Vinegar Hill in June 1798 during the rebellion. The regiment became known for its perseverance in hunting down Irish rebels earning the nickname "Blayney's Bloodhounds". It was posted to Malta in 1800 and arrived in Egypt in March 1801 for service in the Egyptian Campaign. It saw action at the Battle of Alexandria later that month at the Siege of Cairo in April 1801.

=== Napoleonic Wars ===
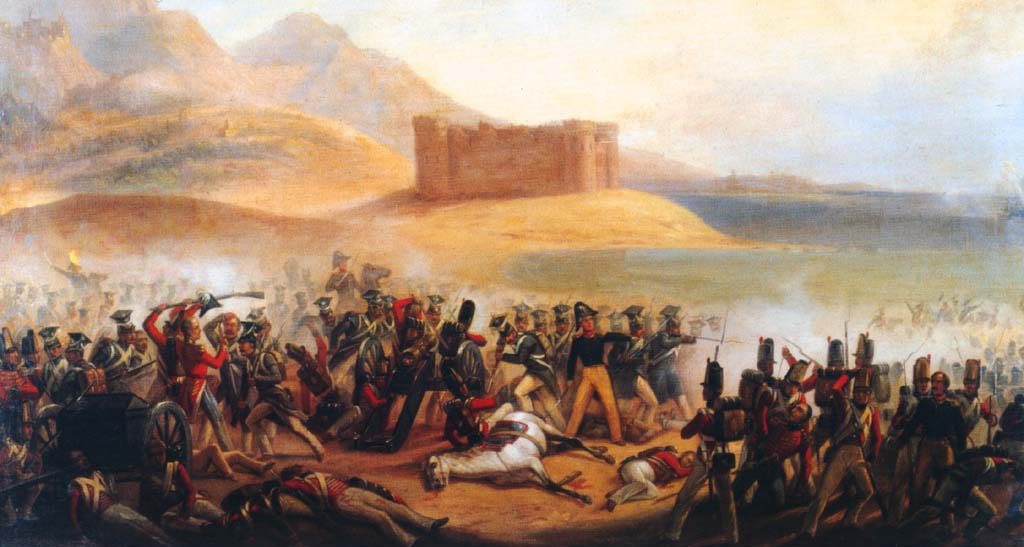
The Battle of Fuengirola, where men from the 2nd Battalion undertook a bayonet charge, in October 1810

A second battalion was raised in Ireland in August 1804. The 1st Battalion embarked for the Hanover Expedition in December 1805 but lost its colours in a storm off Holland. After service in Germany the battalion returned to England in February 1806. The battalion sailed for South America in spring 1807 and took part in the disastrous expedition under Sir Home Popham. It sailed for the Cape of Good Hope later that year and then transferred to Ceylon in 1808. It took part in the Invasion of Isle de France in November 1810, the Invasion of Java in August 1811 and the invasion of Sumatra in March 1812. It transferred to Madras in India in 1815 and re-absorbed the 2nd Battalion in November 1816.

Meanwhile, four companies from the 2nd Battalion embarked for Cádiz in October 1810 for service in the Peninsular War. Under the command of Lord Blayney, the four companies of the 2nd battalion took part in a bayonet charge at the Battle of Fuengirola in October 1810. After defeat in the battle Lord Blayney and most of his troops were held as prisoners of war for the next four years.

One company from the battalion embarked for North America in summer 1812 for service in the War of 1812. It saw action at the Raid on Black Rock in July 1813 and the Battle of Crysler's Farm November 1813. At Crysler's Farm the men of the 2nd Battalion, under the command of Lieutenant-Colonel Joseph Morrison, rose up out of concealment and opened fire on the attacking American Forces. The Americans dived behind tree stumps and bushes to return fire, and their attack lost all order and momentum. As ammunition ran short, they began to retreat out of line. The battalion went on to fight at the Battle of Buffalo in December 1813. At Buffalo, the men of the 2nd Battalion scored an early success when they drove off the American piquet at Conjunckaty Creek and captured the bridge and the battery there.

The Battle of Lundy's Lane, which the regiment fought in

The men of the 2nd Battalion also fought at the Battle of Longwoods in March 1814. They were less successful at Longwoods: Captain James Basden of the 2nd Battalion led a charge against the American position. As the British troops advanced towards a bridge, bunched into a column by the narrow road, the Americans poured a withering fire into them, mowing down the leading troops. After the British troops had crossed the bridge, Basden was wounded in the leg, and his men fell back into a ravine where the Americans fired on them from a height and inflicted heavy casualties. The men from the 2nd Battalion also saw action at the Battle of Lundy's Lane in July 1814 and the Siege of Fort Erie in August 1814 before embarking for home in June 1815.

=== The Victorian era ===
The regiment, still in India, fought the Pindaris in 1817 and was deployed to Burma in 1824 for service in the First Anglo-Burmese War: it formed part of an army which advanced up the River Irrawaddy to the Kingdom of Ava. It returned to India arriving in Madras in 1826 and to England in 1831. It embarked for the West Indies in 1835 and went on to Canada before returning home in 1847. It sailed for Gibraltar in 1854 and then saw action at the Siege of Sevastopol in winter 1854 during the Crimean War. It transferred to the Cape Colony in 1855 to protect British interests there while the cattle-killing movement was at its height before embarking for India in 1857 to help suppress the Indian Rebellion. It returned home in August 1865 and became the 89th (The Princess Victoria's) Regiment of Foot in May 1866. It returned to India in 1870 and was deployed to Rangoon in Burma in 1876 before going back to India in 1880.

As part of the Cardwell Reforms of the 1870s, where single-battalion regiments were linked together to share a single depot and recruiting district in the United Kingdom, the 89th was linked with the 94th Regiment of Foot and assigned to district no. 65 at Gough Barracks in Armagh. On 1 July 1881 the Childers Reforms came into effect and the regiment amalgamated with the 87th (Royal Irish Fusiliers) Regiment of Foot to form the Princess Victoria's (Royal Irish Fusiliers).

== Battle honours ==
Battle honours won by the regiment were:

- Napoleonic Wars: Egypt (Sphinx superscribed "Egypt"), Java
- American war of 1812: Niagara
- Anglo-Burmese Wars: Ava
- Crimean War: Sevastopol

== Colonels of the Regiment ==
Colonels of the Regiment were:

=== 89th Regiment of Foot ===
- 1793–1795: Maj-Gen. William Crosbie
- 1795–1797: Lt-Gen. Andrew Gordon
- 1797: Lt-Gen Henry Bowyer
- 1797–1801: Gen. Alexander Ross
- 1801–1802: Gen. James Ogilvie
- 1802–1806: Gen. Sir Eyre Coote, GCB, KC
- 1806–1808: Lt-Gen. John Whitelocke
- 1808–1818: Gen. Albemarle Bertie, 9th Earl of Lindsey
- 1818–1823: Gen. Sir George Beckwith, GCB
- 1823–1837: Gen. Sir Robert Henry MacFarlane, KCB, GCH
- 1837–1857: Gen. Sir Charles Bulkeley Egerton, GCMG, KCH
- 1857–1864: Gen. Charles George James Arbuthnot
- 1864–1870: Gen. Charles Gascoyne

=== 89th (The Princess Victoria's) Regiment of Foot- (1866) ===
- 1870–1874: Lt-Gen. Sir John Garvock, GCB
- 1874: Maj-Gen. Caledon Richard Egerton
- 1874–77: Lt-Gen. Lord Henry Hugh Manvers Percy, VC, KCB
- 1878-1880: General Sir Henry de Bathe, 4th Baronet
- 1880: General John Arthur Lambert

== Sources ==
- Quimby, Robert S. (1997). The U.S. Army in the War of 1812: An Operational and Command Study. East Lansing, Michigan: Michigan State University Press. ISBN 0-87013-441-8.
- Poole, J. I. (1964). "The Fight at Battle Hill". In Zaslow, Morris (ed.). The Defended Border: Upper Canada and the War of 1812. Macmillan of Canada. OCLC 480289.
- Way, Ronald L. (1964). "The Day of Crysler's Farm". In Zaslow, Morris (ed.). The Defended Border: Upper Canada and the War of 1812. Macmillan of Canada. OCLC 480289.
