= William Crosbie (British Army officer) =

Major-General William Crosbie
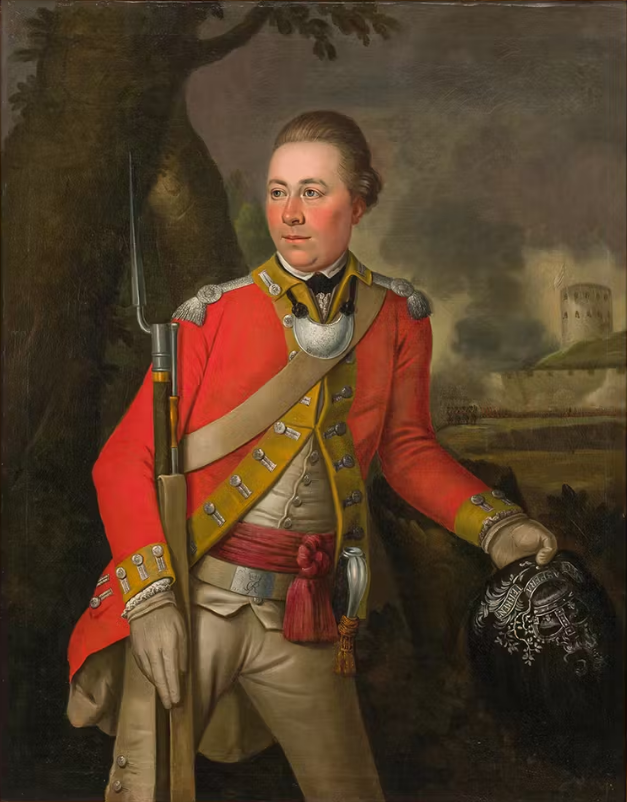
- Portrait by Robert Hunter, c. 1774
- Born: c. 1740
- Died: 16 June 1798
- Military career
- Allegiance: Great Britain
- Branch: British Army
- Rank: Major general
- Conflicts: American War of Independence; French Revolutionary Wars

Major-General William Crosbie (c. 1740 – 16 June 1798) was a British Army officer who served in the American War of Independence and French Revolutionary Wars and held several senior commands in the British Army, including that of Lieutenant-Governor of Portsmouth.

== Military career ==
Crosbie was commissioned as an ensign in the 38th Regiment of Foot in 1757. He was promoted to lieutenant in 1759 and captain in 1769. After serving at the evacuation of Boston in March 1776 during the American Revolutionary War, he was promoted to major in 1778. Promoted to lieutenant colonel in 1781, he became commanding officer of the 22nd Regiment of Foot on promotion. He raised the 89th Regiment of Foot in December 1793 and was promoted to major-general in 1794.

Crosbie also served as colonel of the 89th Regiment of Foot from 1793 to 1795 and as colonel of the 22nd Regiment of Foot from 1795 to his death in 1798. He was also Member of Parliament for Newark from 1790 to 1796.

== Death and legacy ==
Crosbie died by suicide on 16 June 1798 while serving as Lieutenant-Governor of Portsmouth. He reportedly suffered from severe mental distress. He never married, but left most of his estate to an illegitimate son, Charles Carmichael Carr (1788–1859), who later became a bishop.

Military offices
Preceded by New Post	Colonel of the 89th (The Princess Victoria's) Regiment of Foot; 1793–1795	Succeeded by Andrew Gordon
Preceded by David Dundas	Colonel of the 22nd (the Cheshire) Regiment of Foot; 1795–1798	Succeeded by John Simcoe
Parliament of Great Britain
Preceded by Constantine Phipps; John Manners-Sutton	Member of Parliament for Newark; 1790–1796; With: John Manners-Sutton	Succeeded by Thomas Manners-Sutton; Mark Wood
