= Niagara Falls History Museum =

Local history museum

Coordinates: 43.08933°N 79.09126°W

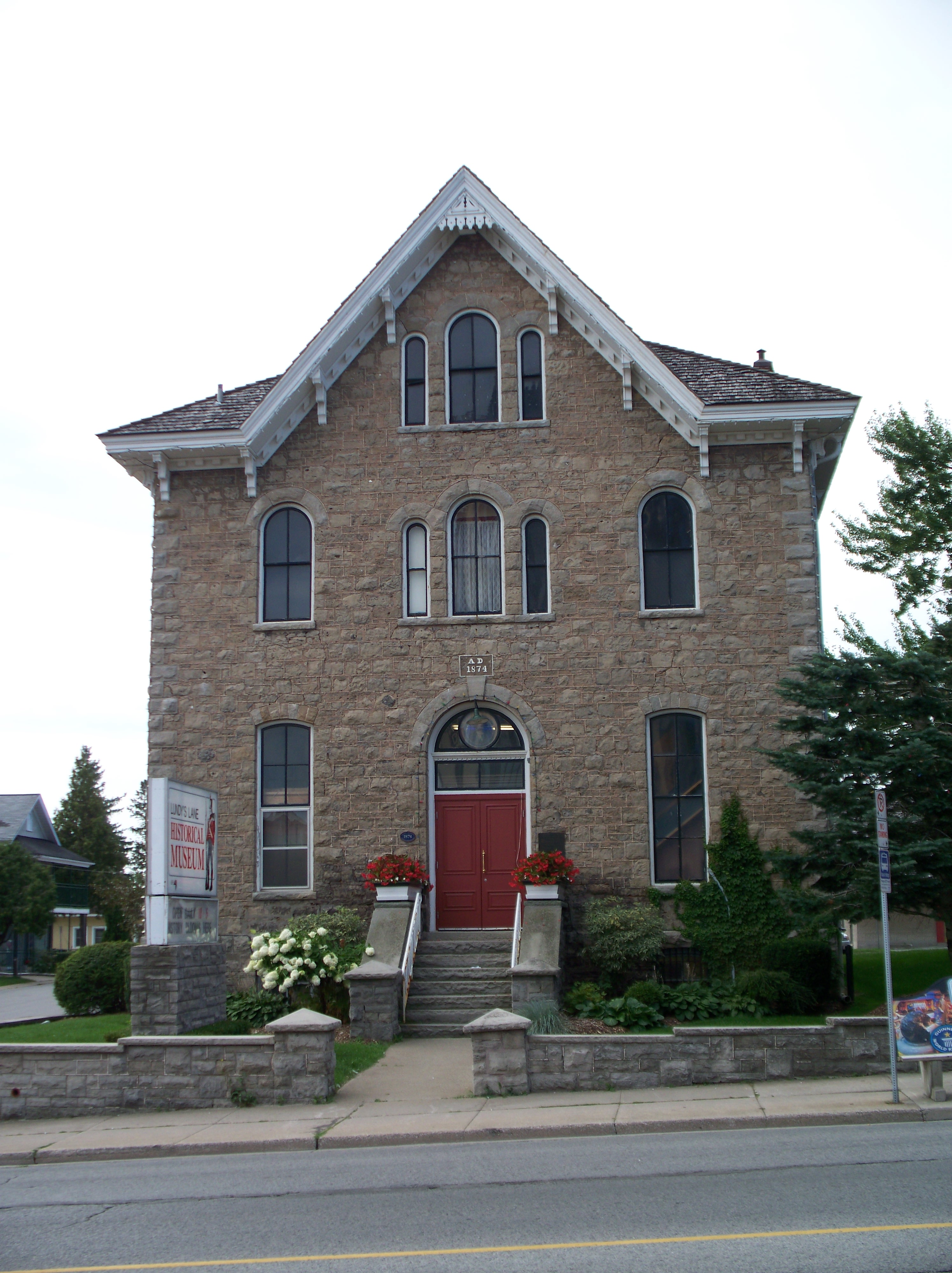
The museum building, the old Stamford Township Hall, built in 1874

The Niagara Falls History Museum is a local history museum in the city of Niagara Falls, Ontario, Canada.

The Museum is housed in the old Stamford Township Hall, which was built in 1874. In 1974, the building was designated as a "Historic Building" under the Ontario Heritage Act.

The Lundy's Lane Historical Society was given the building in 1971, and it became the Lundy's Lane Historical Museum. On January 1, 2010, the City of Niagara Falls took over the running of the museum and it became known as the Niagara Falls History Museum.

The museum includes a large collection relating to the history of Niagara Falls. It underwent a CA$12 million renovation and expansion program, reopening to the public on July 21, 2012. The improvements were designed by Moriyama and Teshima, a Toronto-based architecture firm. The Museum is close to the Drummond Hill Cemetery, where the Battle of Lundy's Lane took place in 1812.
