= William Mulcaster =

Captain Sir William Howe Mulcaster, CB, KCH, KTS (1783 – 12 March 1837) was an officer in the British Royal Navy who played a distinguished part in the Anglo-American War of 1812, in particular in the Engagements on Lake Ontario.

== Early life ==
He was the son of Major General Frederick George Mulcaster (27 February 1739/40 – 18 August 1797) of the Royal Engineers and Mary Juliana Auchmuty (1750–1830), his father's second wife. His mother was a daughter of the Reverend Samuel Auchmuty DD (1725–1777), the Rector of Trinity Church, New York. It seems likely that he was named after General Sir William Howe, whom his father came to know as his ADC, when serving in North America. His elder half-brother was Lt-Gen Sir Frederick William Mulcaster (1772–1846), born in Florida. The family returned to England together in 1778. William was baptised in Saint Helier, Jersey, Channel Islands on 30 October 1783.

== Naval career ==
Mulcaster was commissioned as a lieutenant in the Royal Navy in January 1800. In 1809, he was serving as a lieutenant in the sixth-rate vessel HMS Confiance. One of his fellow officers was his future commander, James Lucas Yeo. Confiance played a significant part in the capture of Cayenne, for which Mulcaster received a commemorative sword from the Prince Regent of Portugal and was promoted to commander.

He was appointed to command the brig-rigged sloop-of-war HMS Emulous serving at Halifax, Nova Scotia. Shortly after war with the United States broke out in 1812, Emulous was wrecked on Cape Sable Island, and Mulcaster was recruited for service on the Great Lakes by Yeo (whose frigate, HMS Southampton had also been wrecked shortly before in the Caribbean).

Mulcaster was initially offered command of the flotilla on Lake Erie but he declined on grounds of the scarcity of resources there. Instead, he acted as second in command to Yeo. In that role, he commanded the sloop Royal George in 1813 in several actions on Lake Ontario against the American squadron led by Isaac Chauncey.

Both combatants on Lake Ontario were building progressively larger ships of war. Yeo laid down a frigate, to be named Prince Regent, and requested the Admiralty to promote Mulcaster to the rank of post-captain to command her. This was agreed. Before the ship was launched, in late 1813, Mulcaster commanded several vessels from the Lake Ontario flotilla which were escorting supply convoys up the Saint Lawrence River. He encountered the vessels of American General James Wilkinson's expedition against Montreal at French Creek and harassed the American encampments. When Wilkinson set off down the Saint Lawrence, Mulcaster hastened to Kingston with the news and then sailed in pursuit with armed schooners and gunboats, with a detachment of soldiers commanded by Lieutenant Colonel Joseph Wanton Morrison embarked. On 11 November Mulcaster's gunboats helped goad Wilkinson into a hasty attack against Morrison which led to the American defeat at the Battle of Crysler's Farm.

On 2 May 1814, the British fleet and army on Lake Ontario mounted the Raid on Fort Oswego to intercept supplies and armaments for the American fleet. Mulcaster took part in the landing, leading 200 sailors armed with boarding pikes but he was severely wounded by a grapeshot and eventually lost a leg. This ended his active career, for which he received a pension of £300 and was nominated a Companion of the Order of the Bath.

== Later life ==
In October 1814, he married Sophia Sawyer Van Cortlandt (1789–1841), the youngest daughter of Colonel Philip Van Cortlandt (1739–1814) and Catherine Ogden (1746–1828) and a descendant of Stephanus Van Cortlandt, the first native born Mayor of New York City and the Schuyler family, at Duloe in Cornwall. Colonel Van Cortlandt was an American of Dutch descent who had refused to take the colonists' side in the American War of Independence. Having lost his substantial property in America, he left with the evacuation of New York City and sailed to England with his wife and family in 1783.

Mulcaster and his wife Sophia had at least seven children, but only four survived into adulthood. His two surviving sons, William Edward Mulcaster (1820–1887) and William Sydney Smith Mulcaster (1825–1910), both became generals.

In 1831 he received a knighthood and became Naval aide de camp to King William IV.

He died at Guilford Lawn in Dover on 12 March 1837 of complications of a severe wound he received in the War of 1812. He was buried at St Mary's Church, Bishopsbourne, Kent, and there is a memorial tablet to him in the church.
