= Joseph Wanton Morrison =

British Army general

Brigadier-General Joseph Wanton Morrison
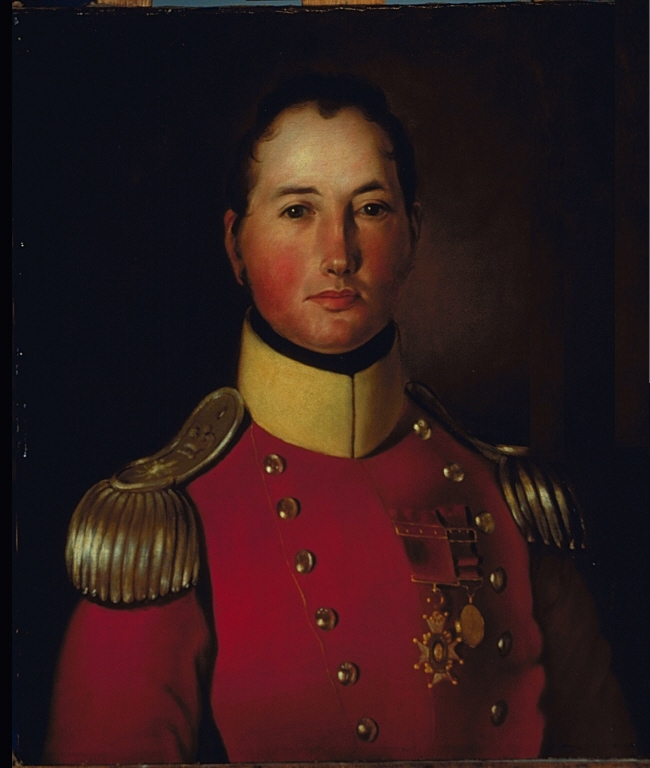
- Born: 4 May 1783; New York, Province of New York, British America
- Died: 15 February 1826 (aged 42); At sea
- Military career
- Allegiance: United Kingdom
- Branch: British Army
- Service years: 1793–1826
- Rank: Brigadier-General
- Units: 2nd Bn., 89th Foot; Royal Sicilian Regiment of Foot; 44th Foot
- Conflicts: Holland Campaign: Battle of Egmont-op-Zee (WIA); War of 1812: Battle of Crysler's Farm; Battle of Lundy's Lane (WIA); First Anglo-Burmese War: Arakan Expedition

Brigadier-General Joseph Wanton Morrison (4 May 1783 – 15 February 1826) was a British Army officer best known for commanding the British troops at the Battle of Crysler's Farm during the War of 1812.

== Early career ==
Morrison was born in New York (which was then under British occupation in the final days of the American War of Independence), the son of a senior Commissariat officer. He joined the British Army as an ensign in 1793, and was present as a Lieutenant in the Anglo-Russian invasion of Holland in 1799, where he was severely wounded at the Battle of Egmont-op-Zee.

He was promoted rapidly through purchase and in 1808, he was in command of the 2nd Battalion of the 89th Foot in Ireland as a Major. Inspecting field officers commented favourably both on the battalion and on Morrison himself. In November 1809, he exchanged into the 1st West India Regiment to gain promotion to Lieutenant-Colonel, serving in Trinidad. In July, 1811, he returned to the 2/89th as its commanding officer. The battalion was stationed in Gibraltar in 1812 when war broke out between Britain and the United States, and it was despatched to reinforce the British troops in Canada.

== Battle of Crysler's Farm ==
In October 1813, the 2/89th were stationed at Kingston in Upper Canada when news arrived that a large American force was descending the Saint Lawrence River, intent on attacking Montreal. Morrison was placed in command of a Corps of Observation which included his own battalion, and was ordered to pursue and harass this American army. His force, numbering 900 and supported by gunboats under Captain William Mulcaster, was encamped at Crysler's Farm on 11 November. Major General James Wilkinson, commanding the American army, determined to drive Morrison's force away before proceeding further down the river. On favourable ground and using the classic British tactics of fighting in line and firing deliberate controlled volleys, Morrison's troops easily repulsed the American attack, even though outnumbered three to one, and captured a 6-pounder gun which the Americans abandoned as they retreated.

== Later career and death ==
In July 1814, Morrison was severely wounded at the Battle of Lundy's Lane, and saw no further action in the War of 1812, although he was a member of the court martial board which tried Major General Henry Procter for negligence following the defeat at the Battle of Moraviantown.

After the war, he transferred to the deactivated Sicilian Regiment and went on half pay until 1821. He then became Lieutenant-Colonel of the 44th Foot, which was posted to Calcutta in India. He was promoted to Brigadier-General to command a brigade in an expedition to the province of Arakan during the First Anglo-Burmese War in 1824. Although the expedition was successful, Arakan was notorious for malaria and other diseases, and Morrison and many of his men fell ill with tropical fever. He died at sea on the voyage back to Britain.

In early 1809 he had married Elizabeth Hester Marriott of Worcester. He and his wife had no children.
