= Donald Graves (historian) =

Canadian historian

Donald E. Graves
- Born: February 19, 1949
- Died: November 11, 2025 (aged 76)
- Education: Carleton University
- Occupation: Military historian

Donald E. Graves (1949-2025) was a Canadian historian specializing in modern military history, especially the War of 1812.

On his mother's side Graves comes from an old Loyalist family (Springer) in Hamilton, Ontario. His father was an executive and his mother a poet and artist. He was educated at the University of Saskatchewan and at Carleton University, where he took an MA in history.

He had been employed as a military historian by the Canadian National Historic Sites Service, the National Archives of Canada and the Canadian Department of National Defence. He was the director of Ensign Heritage Group, a consulting firm that specializes in military topics and acted as an advisor to government and private historic organizations, and filmmakers in Britain and North America. As of the year 2000, Graves lived with his author wife, Dianne, near Ottawa.

Graves sat on the U.S. Secretary of the Interior's Advisory Committee on Revolutionary and War of 1812 Battlefield, the Canadian Minister of Heritage's Advisory Committee on the War of 1812 Bicentenary and was an Honorary Historical Consultant to the Royal Armouries of Britain.

Graves was the author, co-author or editor of nearly two dozen books. Graves's major effort is "The Forgotten Soldiers' Trilogy," three books (Field of Glory, Where Right and Glory Lead, and All Their Glory Past) which cover the major engagements in the northern theatre of the War of 1812. His work has been widely praised—a review by Jon Latimer in the Times Literary Supplement (13 April 2007) declared that Graves was "probably Canada's foremost military historian." John Elting, reviewing his book, Red Coats and Grey Jackets: The Battle of Chippawa 1814 called it the "definitive analysis" of that engagement as the author "establishes the historical background, describes the opposing armies, brings them into battle, and assesses the results, without wasting a word -- yet his account of the battle combines high colour and exact detail."

== Selected bibliography ==
- Dragon Rampant: The Royal Welch Fusiliers at War, 1793-1815
- Fix Bayonets: The Life and Times of General Sir Thomas Pearson, 1779-1847
- Century of Service: The History of the South Alberta Light Horse
- Another Place, Another Time: A U-boat Officer's Wartime Album (with Werner Hirschmann)
- In Peril on the Sea: The Royal Canadian Navy and the Battle of the Atlantic
- Guns Across the River: The Battle of the Windmill, 1838
- Field of Glory: The Battle of Crysler's Farm, 1813
- South Albertas: A Canadian Regiment at War
- Where Right and Glory Lead! The Battle of Lundy's Lane, 1814 (1999) excerpt and text search
- Redcoats and Grey Jackets: The Battle of Chippawa, 1814 (1996) excerpt and text search
- Normandy 1944: The Canadian Summer (1996) (coauthor Michael Whitby)
- Fighting for Canada: Seven Battles, 1758–1945 (Toronto: Robin Brass Studio, 2000), editor
- First Campaign of An A.D.C.: The War of 1812 Memoir of Lt. William Jenkins Worth, U.S. Army (2012)
- And All Their Glory Past: Fort Erie, Plattsburgh and the Last Battles in the North (2013)
- Blood and Steel 1: The Wehrmacht Archive: Normandy 1944 (2013) excerpt and text search
- Blood and Steel 2: The Wehrmacht Archive: Retreat to the Reich, September to December 1944 (2015) excerpt and text search
- Blood and Steel 3: The Wehrmacht Archive: The Ardennes Offensive, December 1944 to January 1945 (2015) excerpt and text search
- Always Ready: A History of the Royal Regiment of Canada (2017)
- Merry Hearts Make Light Days: The War of 1812 Journal of Lieutenant John Le Couteur, 104th Foot
