= Daniel Parker (general) =

American military officer (1782–1846)

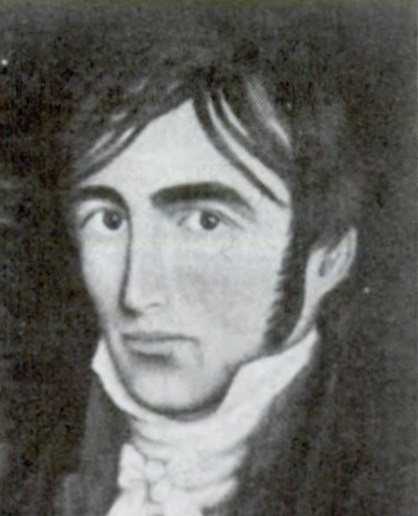
- From The Inspectors General of the United States Army, 1777-1903
- Born: January 29, 1782; Shirley, Massachusetts
- Died: April 5, 1846 (aged 64); Washington, D.C.
- Burial place: Congressional Cemetery
- Military career
- Allegiance: United States of America
- Branch: United States Army
- Service years: 1814–1822
- Rank: Brigadier General
- Commands: Adjutant General of the U.S. Army; Inspector General of the U.S. Army; Paymaster General of the U.S. Army
- Other work: Chief Clerk of the War Department

Daniel Parker (January 29, 1782 – April 5, 1846) was an American military officer who served as Adjutant General, Inspector General and Paymaster-General of the U.S. Army, and as Chief Clerk of the War Department.

== Biography ==
Born on January 29, 1782, in Shirley, Massachusetts, Parker was the son of Lieutenant James Parker and Sarah Dickinson. He graduated from Dartmouth College in 1801, read law, and was admitted to the bar in Charlestown, Massachusetts. He became chief clerk in the U. S. War Department in 1810. On 22 November 1814, he became adjutant general and inspector general of the U.S. Army. In 1821, he became paymaster general. In 1841 he returned to the War Department as chief clerk.

He died on April 5, 1846, in Washington, D.C. His remains were buried 7 April 1846 in the Historic Congressional Cemetery, Washington, D.C.

== Notes ==
Military offices
Preceded by William H. Winder	Adjutant General of the U. S. Army; November 22, 1814-June 1, 1821	Succeeded by James Gadsden
Preceded by William H. Winder	Inspector General of the U. S. Army; November 22, 1814-June 1, 1821	Succeeded by vacant
Preceded by Nathan Towson	Paymaster General of the U.S. Army; 1821-1822	Succeeded by Nathan Towson
