= William H. Winder =

United States Army officer and lawyer

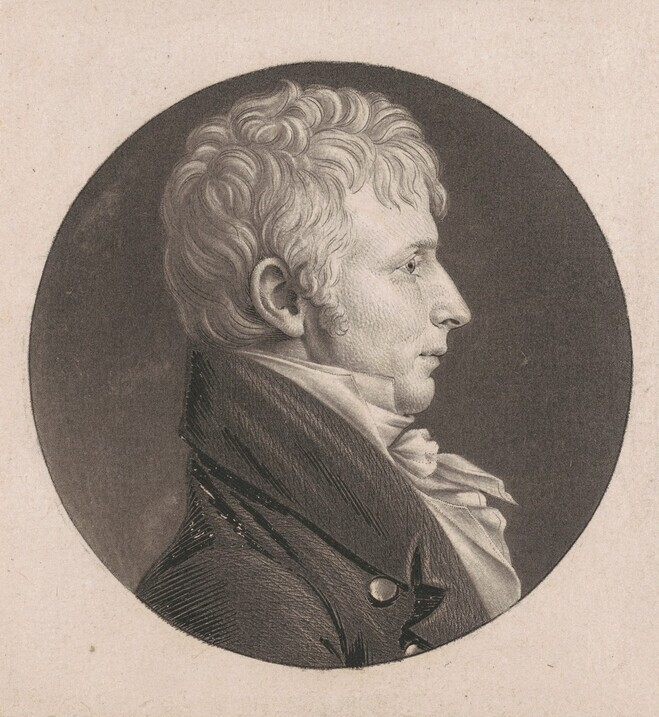
- Portrait by Charles Balthazar Julien Févret de Saint-Mémin, 1804
- Born: February 18, 1775; Somerset County, Maryland, U.S.
- Died: May 24, 1824 (aged 49); Baltimore, Maryland, U.S.
- Education: University of Pennsylvania
- Spouse: Gertrude Polk
- Children: John H. Winder
- Relatives: Levin Winder (uncle)
- Military career
- Allegiance: United States
- Branch: United States Army
- Service years: 1812-1815
- Rank: Brigadier General
- Conflicts: War of 1812; Battle of Stoney Creek (POW); Battle of Bladensburg

William Henry Winder (February 18, 1775 – May 24, 1824) was a United States Army officer and lawyer who served as a brigadier general in the War of 1812. On August 24, 1814, he led American troops during the disastrous US defeat at the Battle of Bladensburg, which led to the Burning of Washington by British forces. Winder was court-martialed for his role in the battle, but acquitted of any wrongdoing. He later became a leading attorney in Baltimore.

== Early life and career ==
Winder was born in Somerset County, Maryland. He was the nephew of Levin Winder. He graduated from the University of Pennsylvania, and from 1798 to 1812, practiced law in Baltimore.

Winder testified at the impeachment trial of Associate Supreme Court Justice Samuel Chase in 1804. He unsuccessfully ran for Congress 5 times: for the U.S. Senate in an 1801 special election and the December 1816 special election; and for Maryland's 5th congressional district in 1808 and both the regular and special elections in 1823.

== War of 1812 ==
Winder was commissioned as a colonel in the U.S. Army at the start of the War of 1812. He participated in the battle of Frenchman's Creek in 1812. Promoted to brigadier general, he took command of the 3rd Brigade in Henry Dearborn's Army of the North and led his brigade in the amphibious landing on the Niagara Peninsula during the Battle of Fort George. He was one of two acting commanders of the American army at the Battle of Stoney Creek in July 1813, where he was captured by Sgt. Alexander Fraser, along with fellow commander John Chandler.

=== Battle of Bladensberg ===
Exchanged the following year, Winder was appointed commander of the new 10th Military District, which composed the defenses of Washington and Baltimore, by fourth President James Madison on July 4, 1814. He received little logistical support from the government, especially Secretary of War John Armstrong Jr. who received much blame for the upcoming disaster and was later fired. In August, British Major-General Robert Ross with several thousand troops advanced from the Royal Navy ships anchored in the upper Patuxent River at Benedict, Maryland (in Prince George's County) upon Washington along with a simultaneous small naval expedition under Capt. James Gordon up the Potomac River to attack the port at Alexandria, (then in the southeast corner of the ten-mile square District of Columbia, previously and later returned to the Commonwealth of Virginia), and provide naval support to Ross's troops once they reached the American capital, across the river to the northwest. Winder had only a few hundred regulars, and a mob of some thousands of two state and District militia units to oppose them.

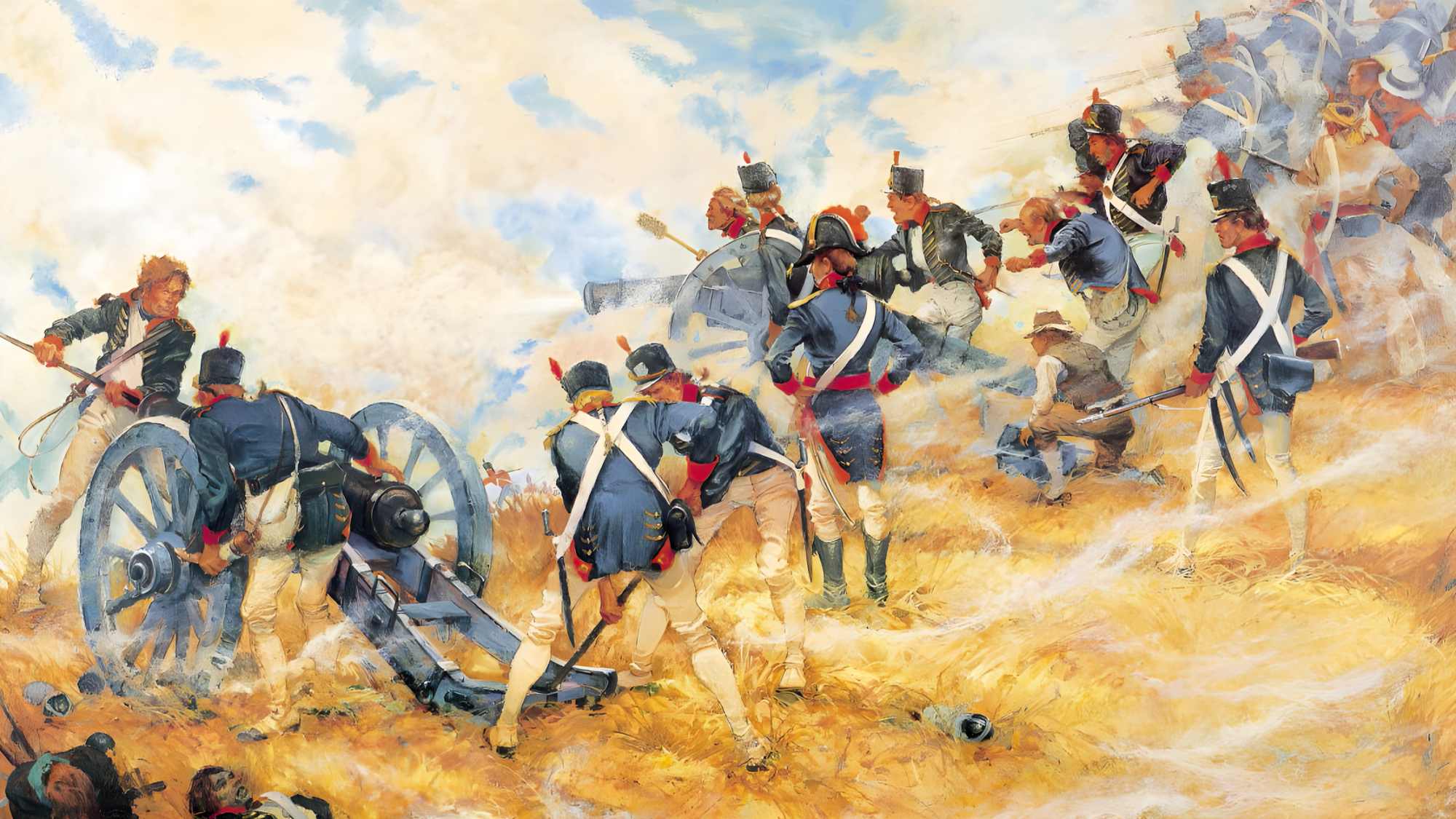
The Battle of Bladensburg, at which Winder suffered a major defeat

Winder made no attempt to skirmish or slow down the advancing British and decided on an all-or-nothing set piece defensive battle at Bladensburg. The Americans met the British at the Battle of Bladensburg on August 24, 1814. He failed to show effective command in the battle, although he received virtually no support from the newly designated Secretary of War and continuing Secretary of State, James Monroe (later fifth President), who actually interfered with his command by repositioning some of the militia regiments, which may have had a significant contribution to the ensuing American rout. He clearly did not support U.S. Naval Commodore Joshua Barney's second line at the center of the American forces along the Washington-Bladensburg Road that actually repulsed the 85th Regiment of Foot after the rout of the American first line following British troops crossing under fire the small creek of the Eastern Branch of the Potomac River (now the Anacostia River). As a result of the battle, the rough unfinished national capital fell easily into the hands of the British who marched in that evening looking for some authorities to surrender the town. Winder was afterward court-martialed, but was acquitted of all blame.

After the debacle of Bladenburg, Winder was quickly maneuvered by the skittish Baltimoreans' municipal, business and military leaders out of having any significant command at Baltimore in favor of the highly competent Samuel Smith, a former Revolutionary War officer and commander, wealthy city merchant and shipper, former U.S. Representative, then Senator for Maryland (later in life elected Mayor of Baltimore) and so was relegated under protest to the command of limited troops on the southwestern and western approaches to Baltimore which were not considered a likely route for the British naval and military attack from the Chesapeake Bay to the east. Winder would have participated in the possible battle at the extensive dug-in fortifications (planned and supervised by Smith in a fortunate premonition and foresight), on "Loudenschlager's Hill" and "Hampstead Hill" (now site of Patterson Park in East Baltimore), on the eastern heights, from the City, had the British decided to carry forward the attack and had the bombardment on Fort McHenry, on September 13–14, been successful.

== Later life and death ==
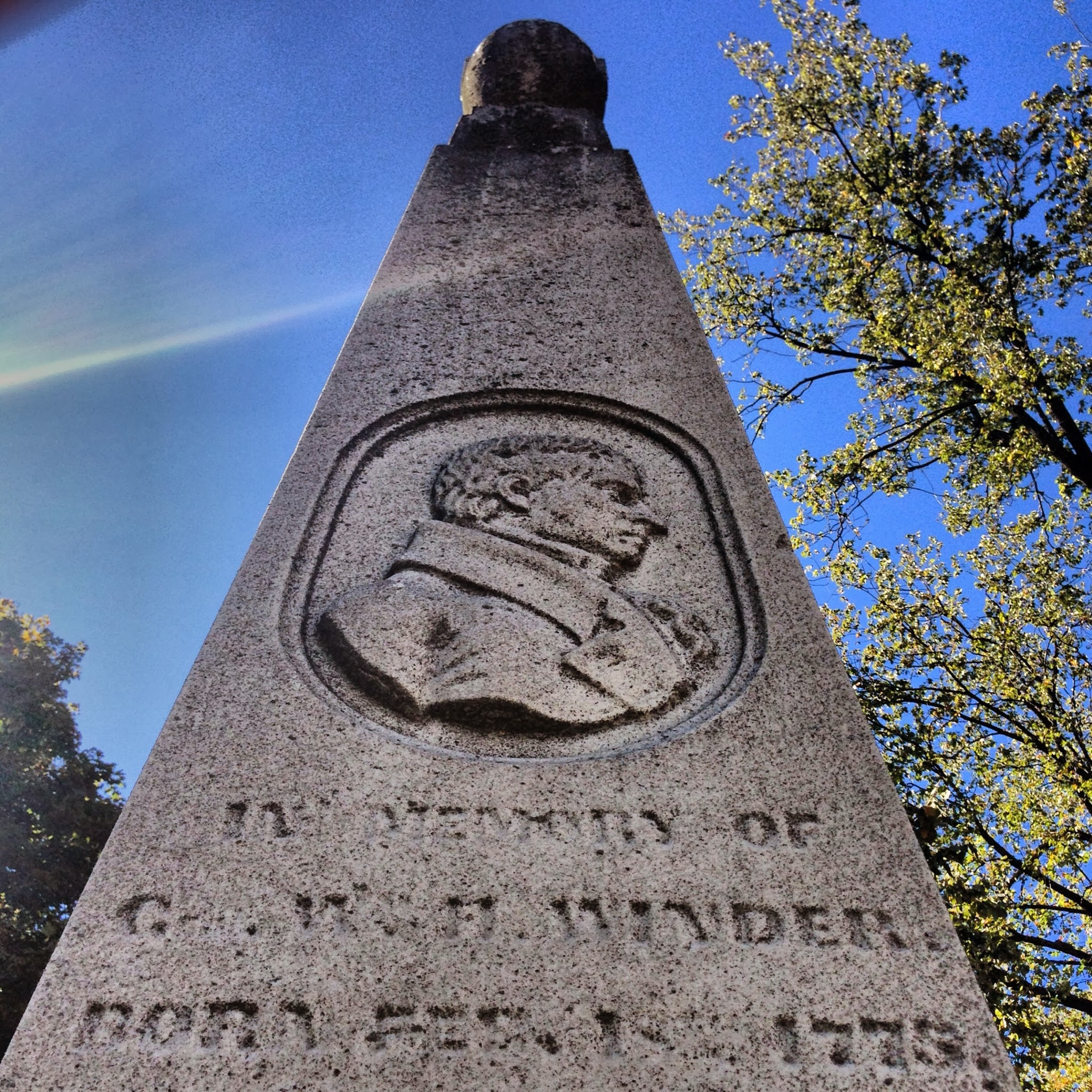
Memorial of Winder in Green Mount Cemetery

After the war, Winder became a leading attorney of the Baltimore bar, joined an influential literary social group called the Delphian Club, and took fellow Delphian, John Neal as an apprentice while he studied law. Winder married Gertrude Polk, daughter of William Polk of Somerset County, Maryland. She was a first cousin about 4 times removed to Colonel Ezekiel Polk grandfather of U.S. President James Knox Polk. One of Winder and Gertrude's sons, John H. Winder (1800-1865), was a brigadier general in the Confederate army during the American Civil War. Winder died in 1824.

== Notes ==
Military offices
Preceded by vacant	Adjutant Generals of the U. S. Army; May 19, 1814-July 2, 1814	Succeeded by Daniel Parker
Preceded by vacant	Inspector General of the U. S. Army; May 9, 1814-July 2, 1814	Succeeded by Daniel Parker
