= Incorporated Militia Battalion of Upper Canada =

- Active: 1813-1815
- Disbanded: 1815
- Country: Upper Canada
- Allegiance: British Empire
- Branch: Canadian Militia
- Type: Militia
- Role: Light Infantry
- Size: Battalion
- Garrison/HQ: Fort York
- Engagements: War of 1812: Battle of York; Battle of Fort George; Battle of Stoney Creek; Capture of Fort Niagara; Battle of Chippawa; Battle of Lundy's Lane; Siege of Fort Erie
- Battle honours: Niagara

The Incorporated Militia Battalion of Upper Canada (often abbreviated IMUC), also commonly known as the Battalion of Incorporated Militia of Upper Canada, the Incorporated Militia of Upper Canada, the Incorporated Militia Battalion or simply as the Incorporated Militia, was a volunteer, full-time infantry battalion raised by Upper Canada during the War of 1812. Although called “militia,” it was trained, armed, uniformed, and largely commanded in the manner of a British Army regular or fencible regiment, serving for the duration of the war rather than only during local emergencies.

== Formation ==
The battalion was authorized in March 1813, when the Upper Canada legislature amended the Militia Act to permit the raising of companies of Incorporated Militia. The measure was a response to the need for dependable reinforcements after the early campaigns of the war. Unlike the province’s sedentary militia, whose members were generally allowed to return home for planting and harvesting, Incorporated Militia soldiers enlisted for continuous service until the war ended. Recruitment incentives included a cash bounty, protection from certain civil debts and taxes while serving, and the promise of a land grant upon discharge.

The original plan envisioned several volunteer battalions assigned to different theatres of Upper Canada: the St. Lawrence region, the central region around York and Burlington, and the Niagara frontier. In practice, the companies were eventually consolidated into a single battalion.

== Organization and Service ==
The battalion drew volunteers from militia flank companies and other parts of Upper Canada. Its officers were largely drawn from the provincial militia, while its commander, Lieutenant-Colonel William Robinson, was a captain in the British 8th (King’s) Regiment given local rank as lieutenant-colonel.

At first, its companies were scattered among garrisons at places including Prescott, Cornwall, Kingston, York, and the Niagara peninsula. In early 1814, Lieutenant-General Gordon Drummond ordered the detached companies concentrated at York, where the battalion trained as a unified force at Fort York before moving into active operations on the Niagara frontier.

The unit was generally employed as light infantry, conducting skirmishing, outpost duty, and supporting operations alongside British regulars, fencibles, and other Canadian troops. Contemporary accounts describe it as an effective combatant force, in contrast to the less reliable performance often associated with the ordinary sedentary militia.

== Campaigns and Battles ==
The Incorporated Militia Battalion served principally in the Niagara campaign of 1813–1814. A detachment joined the Centre Division before Fort George in September 1813, and other detachments subsequently operated in the region.

Its most prominent engagement was the Battle of Lundy’s Lane on 25 July 1814, one of the bloodiest battles of the War of 1812. The battalion fought as part of the Anglo-Canadian force, and Lieutenant-Colonel Robinson was severely wounded during the action.

The battalion also served in the defensive operations around Fort George and Fort Mississauga, where it worked alongside British regular regiments and artillery to strengthen and hold the Niagara position against American advances.

== Disbandment ==
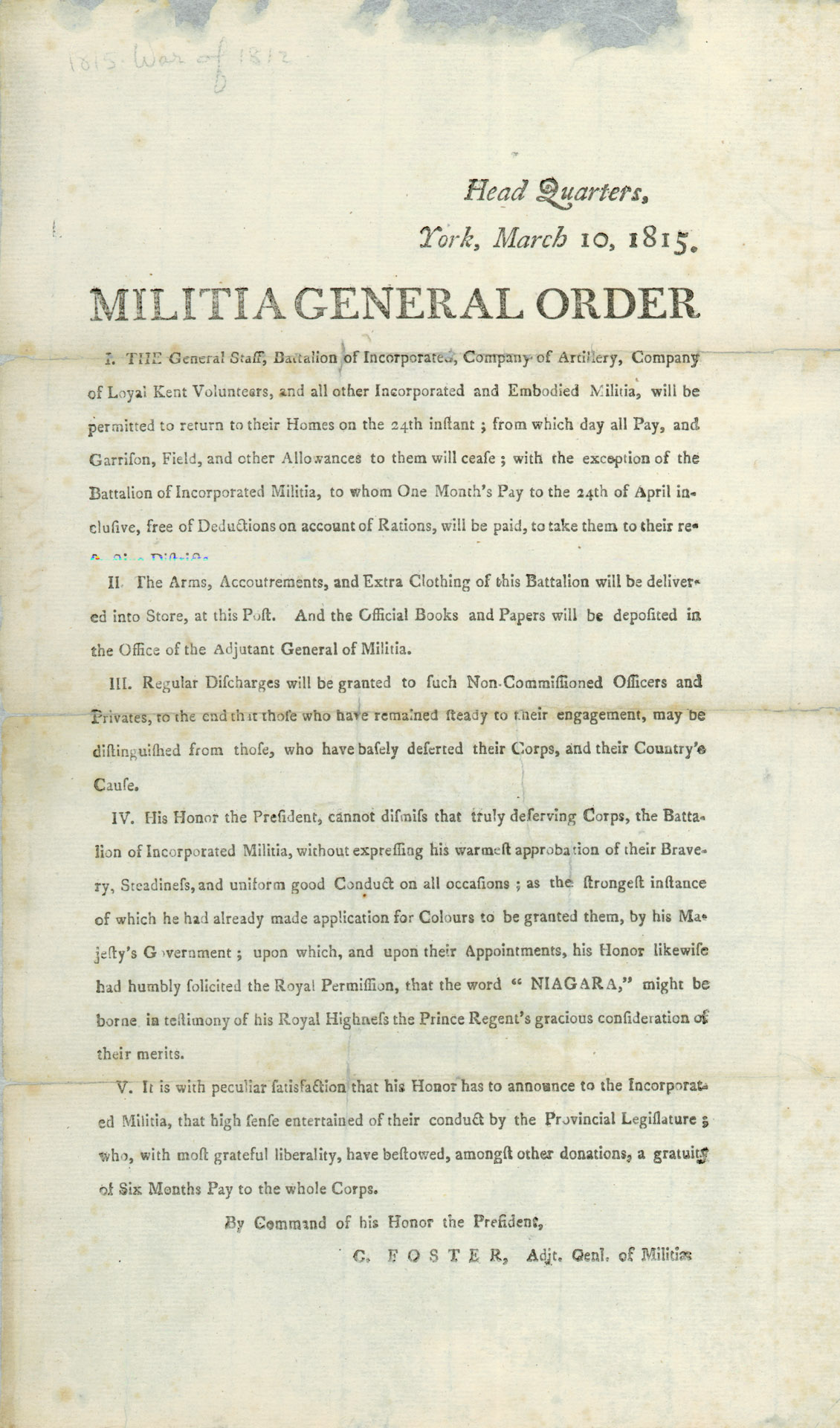
A militia general order issued from York demobilizing the full-time militia in Upper Canada after the end of the war, in March 1815

With the coming of peace in early 1815, the battalion was concentrated at Fort York and stood down. Its soldiers were to receive six months’ pay without deductions, a final issue of trousers and shoes, and a promised land grant; however, the timing and administration of the land grants were not precisely fixed.

Many former officers and soldiers later became prominent figures in Upper Canada, serving as magistrates, judges, legislators, customs officials, and senior officers in the postwar county militias.

== Colours ==
Prior to the end of hostilities and the disbandment of the battalion, Lieutenant-General Drummond had petitioned to the Secretary of State for War and the Colonies, the Earl Bathurst, for among other requests the purchase and official issue of a pair of regimental “colours” for the Incorporated Militia; in recognition of their services and good conduct during the 1814 campaign. It was additionally proposed to have the colours carry the battle honour “Niagara” emblazoned on them.

Despite the disbandment of the battalion in 1815, this request was eventually granted in the spring of 1822. In the militia general orders posted for April 12, 1822 (7 years after the war’s end), it read:

“The Lieutenant Governor has much satisfaction in announcing to the Militia of the province that the Colours have been received which His Majesty had been graciously pleased to command should be prepared for the late Incorporated Battalion and which in commemoration of the services rendered by the Corps on that frontier are inscribed with the word “Niagara.” As the Officers and Soldiers who composed the late Incorporated Battalion are now serving in the different County regiments throughout the Province, the Colours will be lodged in the Government House until the formation of a similar Corps shall require them being brought into the field.... A Guard of Honour consisting of 100 Rank and File ... will be formed in front of the centre [of the line] to receive the Colours as the representative of the Militia of the province, and will escort them to Government House ... it is suggested ... to employ on the Guard of Honor such Officers and soldiers of the respective Regiments as may have belonged to the late Incorporated battalion.

The Lieutenant Governor has much satisfaction in announcing to the Militia of the province that the Colours have been received which His Majesty had been graciously pleased to command should be prepared for the late Incorporated Battalion and which in commemoration of the services rendered by the Corps on that frontier are inscribed with the word “Niagara.” As the Officers and Soldiers who composed the late Incorporated Battalion are now serving in the different County regiments throughout the Province, the Colours will be lodged in the Government House until the formation of a similar Corps shall require them being brought into the field.... A Guard of Honour consisting of 100 Rank and File ... will be formed in front of the centre [of the line] to receive the Colours as the representative of the Militia of the province, and will escort them to Government House ... it is suggested ... to employ on the Guard of Honor such Officers and soldiers of the respective Regiments as may have belonged to the late Incorporated battalion.”

On April 23, 1822 (St. George’s Day), the formal parade for the presentation of the colours was held. As the general orders had stipulated, standing proudly in the company lines were one hundred veterans of the Incorporated Militia.

Today, the former colours of the IMUC are held in secure storage (away from the public) at the Canadian War Museum in Ottawa.

== Uniform and Equipment ==
The battalion wore red coats with green facings, but uniforms and equipment were issued unevenly, and not every company necessarily received a complete or officially standardized uniform. Late in 1814, Lieutenant-General Drummond proposed giving the battalion the same uniform as the Glengarry Light Infantry, reflecting its regular employment as skirmishing infantry.

== Perpetuation ==
Within the Canadian Army, the Incorporated Militia Battalion of Upper Canada is perpetuated by 4 different units from where its constituted companies had been first recruited and organized: the Queen's York Rangers (1st American Regiment); the Princess of Wales Own Regiment; the Lincoln and Welland Regiment; and the Brockville Rifles. As such, these units (minus the Brockville Rifles as rifle regiments traditionally do not carry colours) carry on their colours the War of 1812 battle honours won by the Incorporated Militia Battalion of Upper Canada:

- Defence of Canada – 1812–1815 – Défense du Canada
- Niagara

== Notable Members ==
- Captain Archibald McLean
- Captain Jonas Jones
- Lieutenant William Morris (Regimental Adjutant)
- Lieutenant Henry Ruttan
- Lieutenant Henry Burritt
- Ensign John Kilborn

== Modern Re-enactment unit ==
There is a Modern Re-enacting unit in Southern Ontario that recreates the IMUC at various 1812 events as well as the Incorporated Militia Artillery Company. Both are part of the Military Re-Enactment Society of Canada.

== See also ==
- Canadian units of the War of 1812
