= Billy Green (scout) =

William Green, otherwise known as Billy Green the Scout, was key to the British-Upper Canadian victory at the Battle of Stoney Creek. Billy Green was born February 4, 1794, in the Saltfleet Township in Upper Canada, and died March 15, 1877. His father was a New Jersey Loyalist named Ensign Adam Green. His mother, Martha Green, died a year or so after Billy was born, so he was raised by his oldest sister. He was the last born of the eleven children in his family. According to local tradition, he is believed the first white child born in the vicinity of Stoney Creek, Ontario.

== Billy Green's contribution to the battle ==
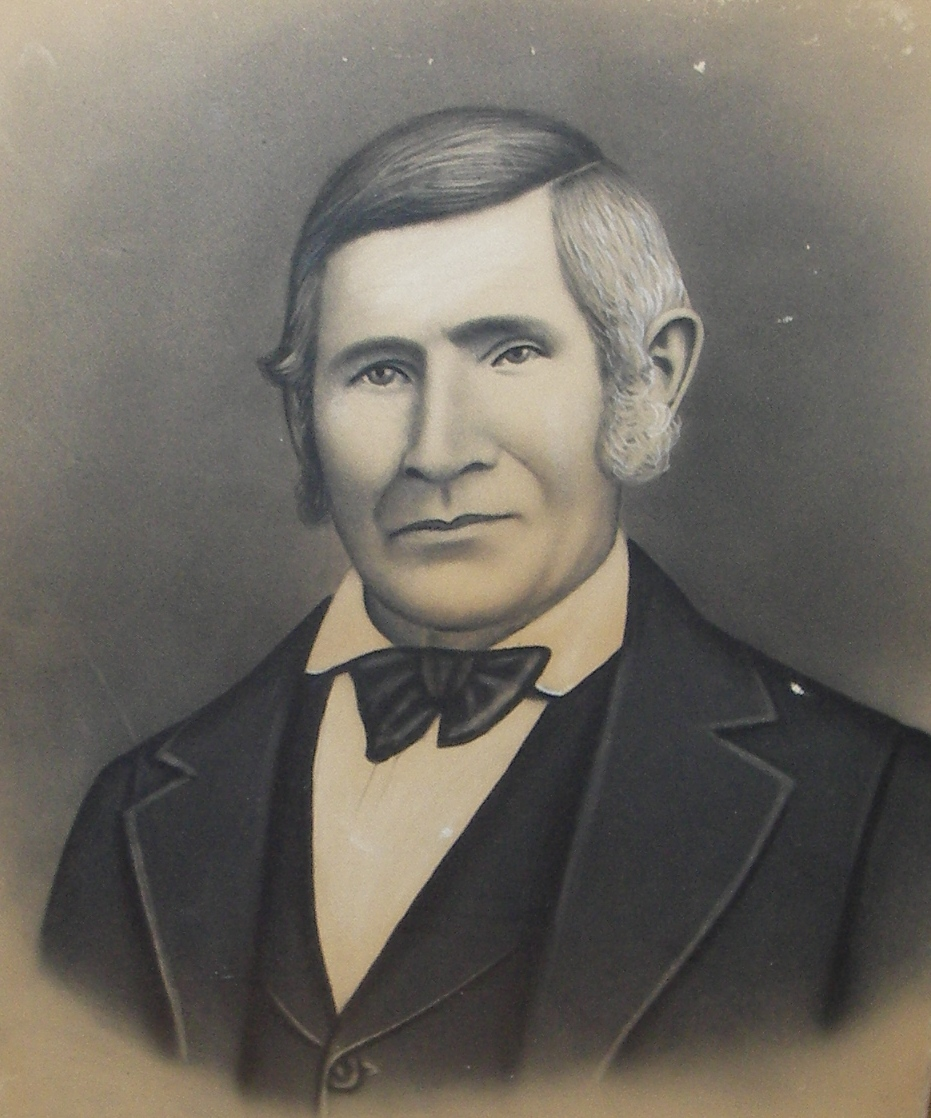
Photograph taken of a painting in the house William Green built, and occupied by his great, great granddaughter Barbara Green. Artist unknown.

On June 5, 1813, Billy's sister reported to him that her husband, Isaac Corman, had been captured by the Americans, who held him near the beach on Lake Ontario. Corman convinced some American officers that he was a cousin of William Henry Harrison, an American politician (and later president) who was major-general of US troops in the north-west. The officers released Isaac, who then requested the counter-sign so that he could get past the American sentries and go home. They gave it to him—it was Wil-Hen-Har, after the major general, and released him. Billy caught up to Corman and got the password. The Americans, realizing their mistake, promptly caught up to Corman and recaptured him.

Billy took his brother Levi's horse "Tip" and rode to Burlington Heights to warn the British. The British, who had recently themselves spied on the Americans, assumed Billy was a spy. After questioning him, Lieutenant-Colonel John Harvey decided he was not a spy. He realized that the password and Billy's intimate knowledge of the countryside would help Harvey's planned surprise attack on the American camp at night. He gave Billy a sword and asked him to guide the troops. They left just before midnight, with Harvey in charge.

They first encountered American sentries at Davis' tavern at Big Creek (now Red Hill Creek), who fired their muskets and dispersed. They encountered more sentries along the way, in the woods and near a church. Billy dispatched one of the sentries with his sword, while giving him the countersign. As they snuck up to the American camp they saw fires set by the American troops, on the other side of a lane. Billy was present at the battle but was not injured.

The monument, erected on the battlefield in 1913, at the centenary of the Battle, is inscribed Scout Green.

== Controversy and proof ==
Various accounts have greatly embellished this version of events. For example, one account called Green the "Paul Revere of Canada," and claimed that he "sighted the American army massing below the mountain at Stoney Creek" and "felt it his duty to inform the English troops of their nearness". This is a fabrication, as the British knew exactly where the Americans were, and knew they were being pursued by them. Such easily demonstrable inventions have fueled commentary that the whole story is a legend, raising substantial questions as to the authenticity of the accepted historical record regarding Billy Green's purported actions and presence at the Battle of Stoney Creek, most notably by journalist James E. Elliott. A shorter version of Elliott's analysis of the historical record was published in The Hamilton Spectator in December 2009.

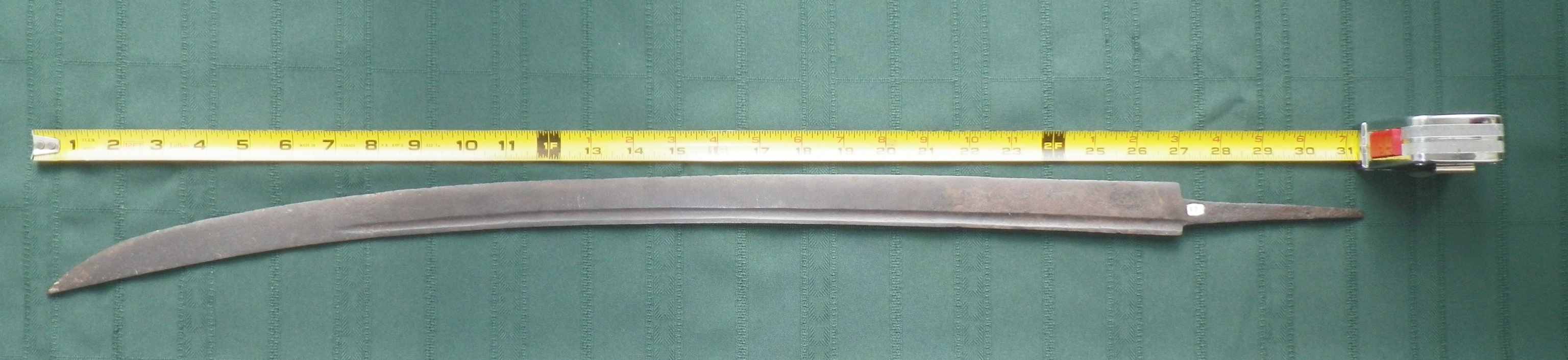
The sword Lieutenant-Colonel John Harvey gave to Billy Green the Scout before the Battle of Stoney Creek, June 5, 1813

Articles published in 2011 and 2013 rebut questions raised about Green's actions at Stoney Creek. The first is an article in the War of 1812 Magazine, in which author Philip Green reviews primary and secondary source evidence and material cultural evidence from the time of the battle. The primary source evidence consists mostly of written correspondence from British officers and American officers in the periods leading up to and immediately after the battle. The article compared the correspondence with accounts by Billy Green, and found a close correspondence. The conclusion from the article is that, by the standard of evidence used to accept Laura Secord as historical fact, the story of Billy Green must be accepted as historical fact.

A second article that rebuts Elliot's claim was published in 2011. The authors followed shortly after with another.

== Tribute ==
Billy Green Falls, a complex ribbon waterfall found in Battlefield Creek, Stoney Creek, Hamilton, Ontario, Canada was named after him. Billy Green Elementary School, is also named after him and is nearby.

The book of poetry "Never Counting the Cost" (2012), by Raymond Souster and Les Green, recounts the War of 1812 and Billy Green the Scout. Souster won the Governor General's Award and the Order of Canada. Published by The Battered Silicon Dispatch Box, Eugenia, Ontario.

== Media ==
Stan Rogers popularized Billy Green's exploits in the song "Billy Green the Scout" on the album 'From Coffee House to Concert Hall'. Billy's story was also celebrated by singer George Fox.
