= William Moody (Maine politician) =

American politician (1770–1822)

William Moody (July 10, 1770 – March 15, 1822) was an American politician from Maine. Moody, a resident of Saco, Maine and a Democratic-Republican, served in the Massachusetts Senate for 8 years (1804 to 1812). Moody represented Saco at the Maine Constitutional Convention and was elected to the first Maine Senate in 1820. He took over as President of the Maine Senate after the resignation in June 1820 by John Chandler, who was elected to the U.S. Senate by the Maine Legislature. He also served at the same time as Sheriff of York County. He died unexpectedly on March 15, 1822.

Political offices
Preceded by John Chandler	President of the Maine Senate; 1820-1821	Succeeded by William D. Williamson
