= Alexander Fraser (Scottish soldier) =

Scots military hero & Canadian pioneer

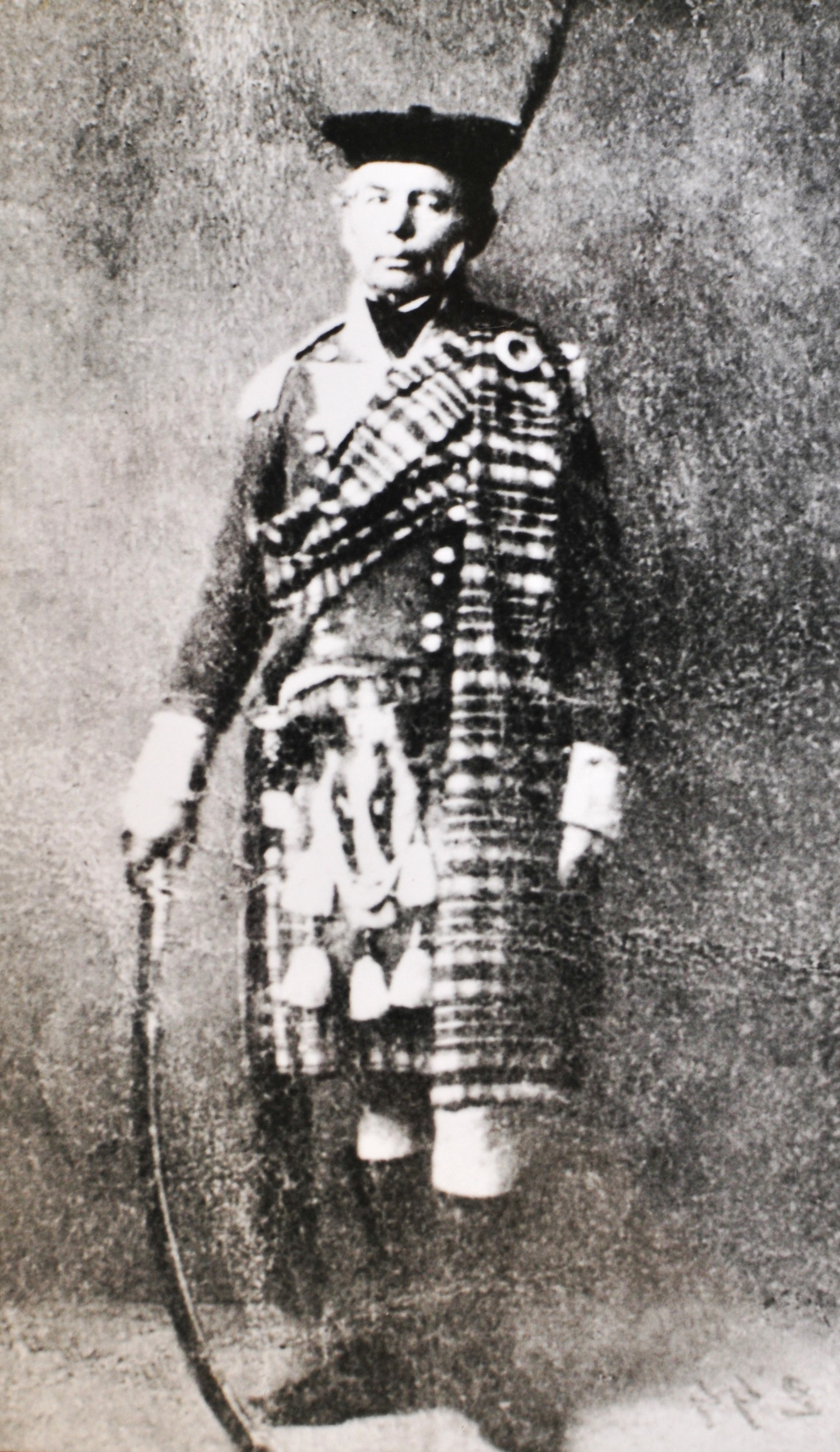
- Born: 1789; Fort Augustus, Scotland
- Died: 10 July 1872 (aged 82–83); Annsfield House, Perth, Ontario, Canada
- Resting place: Old Burying Ground, Pioneer Cemetery, Craig Street, Perth, Lanark County, Ontario, Canada
- Occupations: Joined British Army as a private soldier and rose to lieutenant colonel in the Canadian militia.
- Known for: Led decisive infantry charge and captured two American generals in the Battle of Stoney Creek (1813) in the War of 1812
- Political party: Conservative and loyalist
- Spouse: Ann Earle (married 1814)
- Children: Margaret, Charles, Alexander, Mary Ann, Mary, Peter, James, Elizabeth, William, Harriet, Ann, Maria, Caroline, Willie, Johnnie
- Parent(s): Peter Fraser and Jean McDonald

Alexander Fraser (early 1789 - 10 July 1872) was a Scottish-born British Army officer who served in the War of 1812 and later became a prominent figure in the early colonial development of Eastern Ontario, Canada. He is notably remembered for his pivotal role in the Battle of Stoney Creek, where he captured both commanding American generals after leading a decisive night attack. Fraser later held the rank of lieutenant colonel in the Canadian militia and was a founder, landowner, and magistrate of the town of Perth in Ontario.

== Early life ==
Alexander Fraser was born in early 1789 at the Fort Augustus barracks in Inverness-shire, Scotland, the eldest son of Peter Fraser, a veteran drummer in the 71st Regiment of Foot, and Jean MacDonald. The family included six children. As dependents of a soldier, they likely received accommodation, rations, and education at the barracks. In 1807, Fraser enlisted in the 10th Royal Veteran Battalion alongside his father and two brothers. The battalion was soon deployed to Canada for garrison duty on the frontier amid rising tensions with the United States. The family is believed to have arrived in Quebec in September 1807.

== Service in the War of 1812 ==
In August 1810, Alexander Fraser transferred to the 49th Regiment of Foot, a leading regiment known as the 'Green Tigers' for its fighting reputation. His brother Peter joined him in the same regiment in May 2011. Alexander was promoted to sergeant and appointed assistant sergeant major in January 1813, despite being younger and less experienced than other sergeants.

The United States declared war on Britain on 18 June 1812, and initiated plans for the invasion of Upper Canada. Alexander and Peter Jr. were posted to Fort George, at present-day Niagara-on-the-Lake, on the border between the US and Canada. They likely participated in the Battle of Queenston Heights on 13 October 1812, the first major battle of the war. They were also involved in the unsuccessful defence of Fort George on 27 May 1813, and the subsequent 60-kilometre westward retreat from the advancing American army. The retreating British and Canadian soldiers eventually arrived at poorly fortified positions at Burlington Heights near Stoney Creek, now part of Hamilton, Ontario.

== Battle of Stoney Creek ==
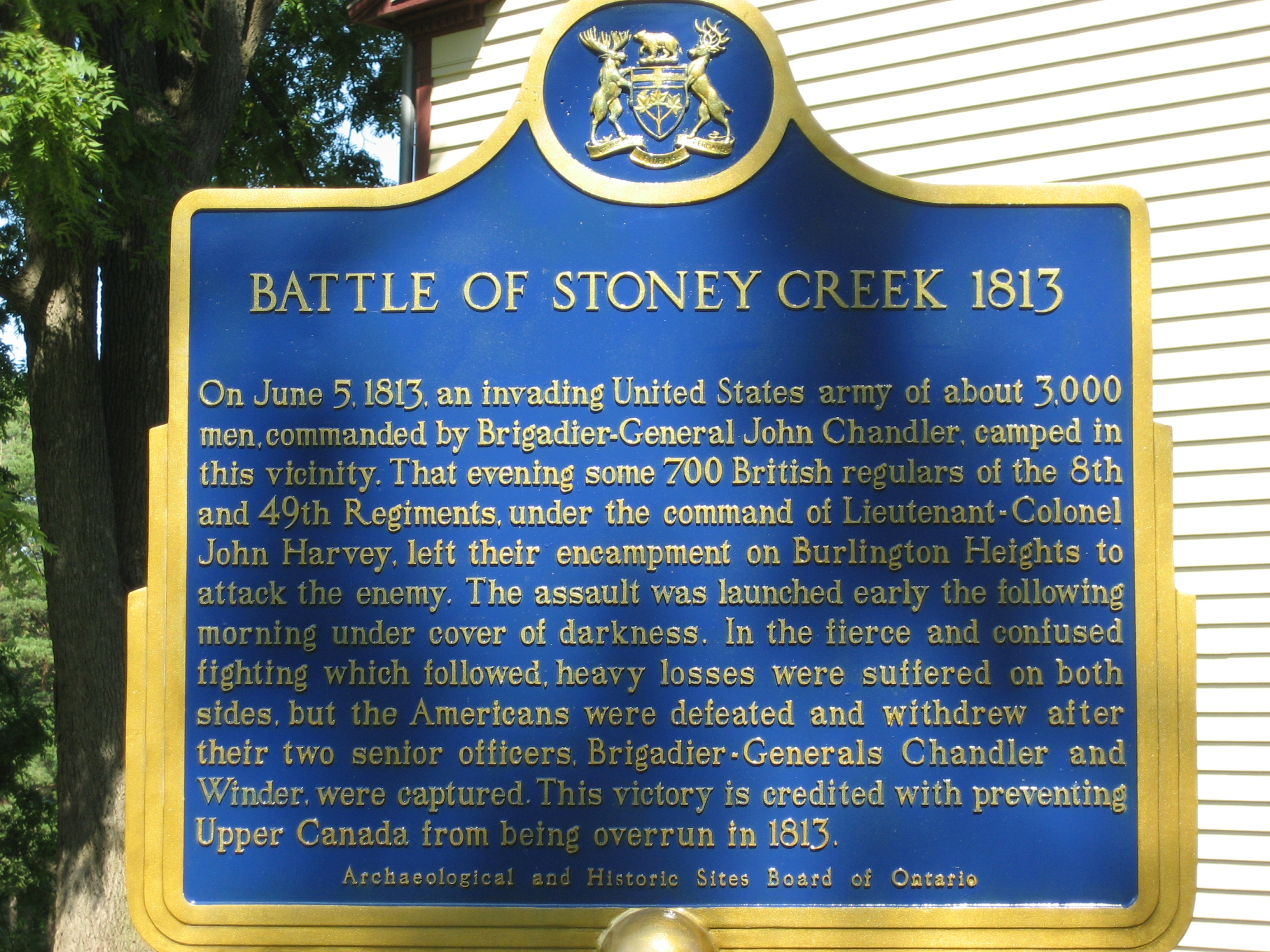
Commemorative board placed at Stoney Creek battlefield by the Archaeological and Historic Sites Board of Ontario

The Battle of Stoney Creek, fought in the early hours of 6 June 1813, was a crucial British and Canadian defensive victory over an invading American force. During a nocturnal engagement, British forces launched a surprise assault on the American encampment. The British victory was largely determined by the capture of both American commanding officers by Fraser and an overestimation by the American forces of British strength. The battle was a turning point in the defence of Upper Canada. Fraser's actions as assistant sergeant major in the 49th Foot Regiment during the battle propelled him into the officer class, a position he leveraged for the remainder of his life.

In the days before the battle, the 49th Foot Regiment was part of a poorly equipped force of approximately 1,600 men, pursued by over twice their number of well-equipped American troops after the British defeat at Fort George. The American army was under the joint command of Brigadier General John Chandler and Brigadier General William Winder. On the evening of 5 June 1813, the invading American force camped alongside a shallow stream near Stoney Creek.

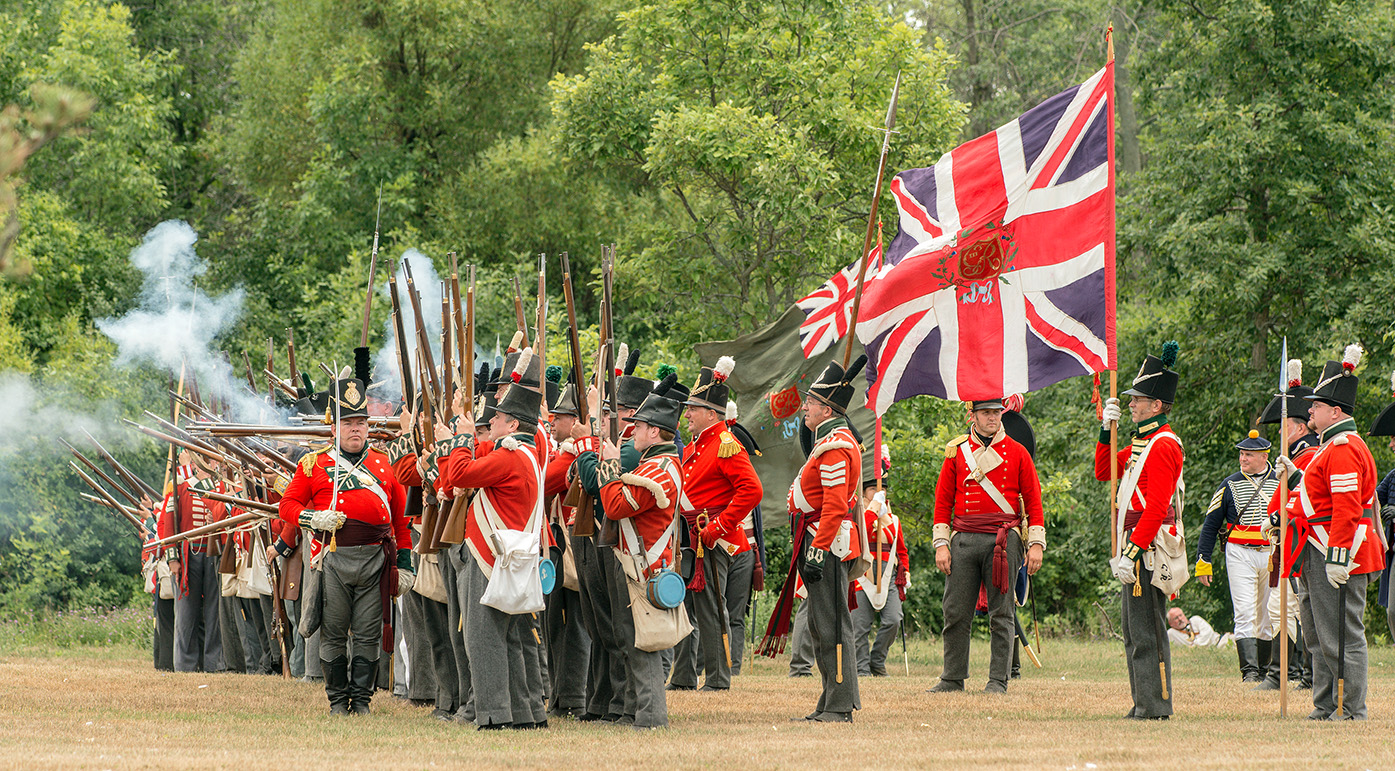
Battlefield House, War of 1812 Re-enactment, Stoney Creek, Ontario

After the Americans established their camp, the British and Canadians, commanded by Lieutenant-Colonel John Harvey, quietly advanced from their nearby base at Burlington Heights and launched a surprise night-time attack with some 800 men. Despite initial success, the larger size of the American force meant the attack soon lost momentum.

Major Charles Plenderleath, commanding the British 49th Foot Regiment, observed the flash of two cannons from the American artillery, positioned close to the 49th's line. Realizing the importance of these guns, Plenderleath called for volunteers to charge the cannons before they could reload. Sergeant Alexander Fraser and his 21-year-old brother Peter, a corporal, were among approximately 20 volunteers.

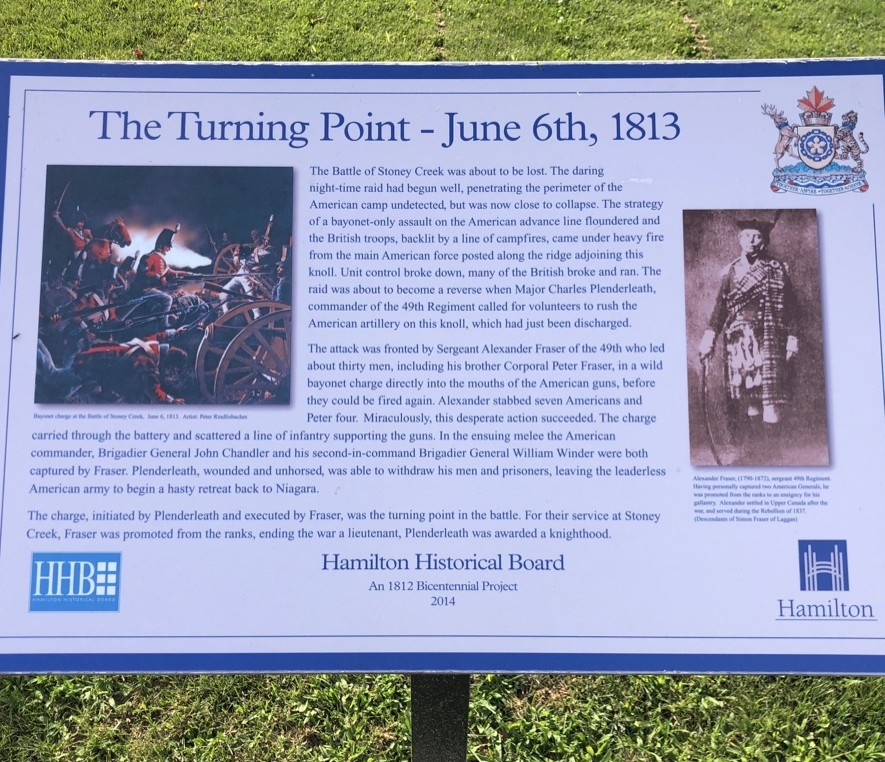
Information panel commemorating Sergeant Alexander Fraser's contribution to victory in the Battle of Stoney Creek. Placed by Hamilton Historical Board (Hamilton City Council) at Smith's Knoll Battlefield Cemetery near Battlefield House Park.

With bayonets fixed, Fraser and Plenderleath led the charge. Fortunately for the British, American General Winder had just ordered the artillery to cease firing, and unaware of the British advance, the artillerymen began hitching their gun carriages to horses. This action meant the cannons were unable to fire and many of the American artillerymen were momentarily without personal arms. The British infantrymen reached the cannons, engaged the gunners and quickly captured the position. They then continued to engage the American 23rd Infantry, which managed one volley before being scattered by the 49th's momentum.

Amidst the confusion, American General Chandler, injured nearby when his horse fell, limped into the newly secured British lines. Sergeant Fraser, taking a break from bandaging Major Plenderleath, took the general as his prisoner. A few minutes later, General Winder, the American co-commander, made the same mistake. Realizing his error, Winder drew his pistol and aimed it at Fraser, who was poised to take him prisoner. Fraser pointed his musket at Winder's chest and also took him prisoner.

Lieutenant James FitzGibbon, commanding the 3rd Company of the 49th Foot, wrote in a letter the day after the battle: "Generals Chandler and Winder were taken and secured – one of them was in the act of aiming his pistol at a young man, Sergeant Fraser of the 49th, when the sergeant raised his fusee (musket) and said: 'If you stir, Sir, you die'. The general took his word for it and threw down his pistol and sword."

The short, intense battle resulted in heavy casualties on both sides. As dawn broke, the British and Canadians retreated into the woods to conceal their small numbers.

FitzGibbon would later write: "the advance thus made...saved that small British army, and consequently most probably the whole of Upper Canada. For had it not been so made, the Americans would have maintained their ground till daylight, when they would have discovered that our force was dispersed in the woods and liable to be easily made prisoners...".

After daybreak, the Americans returned to their camp, burned their provisions and tents, and retreated towards the border at Niagara. The US Army would never again advance so far into Canada from Niagara in its efforts to conquer Upper Canada.

Soon after the battle, Sergeant Alexander Fraser was rewarded for his bravery with a field commission and posted to Fredericton, New Brunswick, as an adjutant in the New Brunswick Fencibles. He was promoted to lieutenant in June 1815. His regiment was disbanded in February 1816, and he was placed on half pay and granted a large land package at the Perth Military Settlement in Eastern Ontario.

== Militia service ==
By 1836, Fraser held the rank of captain in the Lanark Militia and participated in the suppression of the Rebellions of 1837–38. In 1846, he was promoted to lieutenant colonel in command of the 6th Regiment of the Lanark Militia.

== Life in Upper Canada ==
Fraser settled in newly established Perth Military Settlement, Ontario, in 1816. As a subaltern, he received 500 acres of land. In 1823, he built Annsfield, a stone house where he lived until his death. He was appointed a justice of the peace in 1823 and became a respected figure in Lanark County, serving over 30 years in the role. During the first half of the nineteenth century, Perth was the political and social capital of Lanark County and the Ottawa Valley - only to be eventually overtaken by the city now known as Ottawa.

== Political involvement ==
Although unsuccessful in his bids for election in 1836 and 1844, Fraser was politically active as a conservative loyalist and was aligned with establishment figures opposed to the Reform movement.

== Family ==
Fraser married Ann Earle (the daughter of Charles Earle, a United Empire Loyalist who served as a surgeon in the Third Battalion of the New Jersey Loyalists during the American War of Independence) in 1814 and the couple had 15 children, ten of whom survived to adulthood. His sons Alexander Jr. and James Alexander held public service roles in Carleton County, with the latter being recognised by Prime Minister Sir John A. Macdonald in 1879.

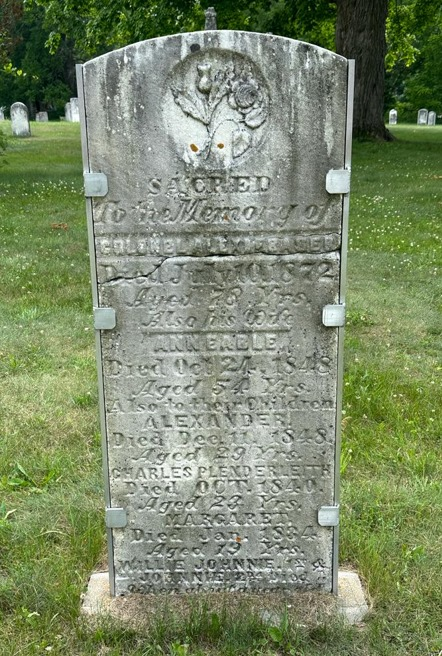
Tombstone in Perth's Old Pioneer Cemetery of Alexander Fraser, as well as his wife Ann, his son Alexander, his son Charles Plenderleith, his daughter Margaret, and his son Johnnie.

== Death and legacy ==
Alexander Fraser died at Annsfield on 10 July 1872 and was buried in the Old Pioneer Cemetery in Perth alongside his wife. In 2013, his grave was marked with a commemorative plaque by the Gravesite Project, honouring veterans of the War of 1812.

Fraser's contributions to Canadian military history and civic life have been documented by historians Ron W. Shaw and M.E. Irene Spence, who describe his ascent from drummer's son to military commander and civic leader as an example of the opportunities for personal advancement available in colonial Canada.
