= John Vincent (British Army officer) =

18/19th-century British Army officer in Canada

General John Vincent (1764–1848) was the British commanding officer of the Niagara Peninsula in Upper Canada when the United States attacked in the spring of 1813. He was defeated at the Battle of Fort George but was able to rebound and establish the new lines at Burlington Heights. He directed the campaign during the summer and fall that eventually forced the Americans to abandon the Niagara area in December 1813, thanks in large part due to his victory over the Americans at the Battle of Stoney Creek. Due to illness he was replaced by General Phineas Riall, though of the several officers of the 49th Regiment who reached high command during the War of 1812, Vincent was the longest-serving of them. British and Canadian accounts of the War give the impression of a modest, well-liked and generous officer, who gave whatever help he could to other commanders. From 1814, he had held the sinecure post of Lieutenant-Governor of Dumbarton Castle.

== Early life ==
He was born in Ireland, the son of John Vincent (1734–1779) of Mardyke, County Limerick, Sheriff of Limerick, by his first wife, Catherine (d.1768), daughter and co-heiress of John Love (d.1750), of Castle Saffron (later renamed Creagh Castle), near Doneraile, County Cork, great grandson of Sir Philip Perceval.

Vincent entered the army as an ensign in 1781. He transferred as a lieutenant into the 49th Foot in 1783, becoming a captain in 1786. He saw service with the regiment in the West Indies and was present at the taking of Haiti. After being promoted to major in 1795, he was ordered back to England for his health, but the vessel on which he sailed was captured by a French frigate and he was detained a prisoner in France for one year. He took part in the Anglo-Russian invasion of Holland in 1799 (was promoted to Lt.-Colonel in 1800), and was present at the Battle of Copenhagen in 1801 under Admiral Sir Hyde Parker. Two years later, the 49th were posted to Upper Canada, and Vincent was accompanied there by his nephew, William Vincent (who had married Frances Blood of Castle Fergus, County Clare, descended from the noted bravo and desperado Colonel Thomas Blood), who had joined the 49th in 1800. Vincent performed various garrison duties at York (Toronto), Fort George (Niagara-on-the-Lake) and Kingston, Ontario for the next ten years or so.

== War of 1812 ==
On the outbreak of war, Vincent led a detachment of the 49th from Lower Canada to Kingston, Ontario, and was commander of this post during the winter of 1812 to 1813, being promoted to brigadier general. His forces fought in the Battle of Kingston Harbour, against the American commodore Isaac Chauncey, and over the winter he successfully bluffed the American commander-in-chief, General Henry Dearborn, into thinking his forces were much larger than they actually were and deterred any attack.

Vincent was subsequently transferred to the Niagara frontier. On 27 May 1813, his positions were attacked in the Battle of Fort George. Although his British and Canadian regulars made a determined defence, Vincent realised that he was about to be outflanked and surrounded, and ordered a rapid retreat.

Vincent's forces halted at a defensive position at Burlington Heights, where Vincent received news of his promotion to major general. The pursuing American forces halted at Stoney Creek (Hamilton, Ontario). Their camp was insecure, and Vincent followed a suggestion by his second in command, Lieutenant-Colonel John Harvey, to mount a night attack. The resulting Battle of Stoney Creek was a clear British victory, badly shaking the Americans. Vincent himself took little part. He was injured when thrown from his horse in the confusion of battle and was finally found wandering in the woods, seven miles from the battle scene, in a state of confusion, convinced that the entire British force had been destroyed; his horse, hat and sword all missing. Harvey, understandably, did not mention this on his report of the battle.

The Americans subsequently retreated to Fort George, and Vincent's forces maintained a blockade of them for several months. During this time Vincent's regiment, the 49th, won the nickname 'Green Tigers' from the Americans because of the fierceness of their fighting and the colour of their facings. After the British defeat at the Battle of Moraviantown, which threatened Vincent's rear, he retreated again to Burlington Heights. By this time, Vincent was ill, and was transferred first to Kingston once again, then to Montreal, before leaving for England.

He never again saw active service, but was promoted Lieutenant General in 1825 and full General in 1843. He had held the sinecure post of Lieutenant Governor of Dumbarton Castle since April, 1814, and became Colonel of the 69th Foot in 1836.

He died unmarried in London.

== Tributes ==
The Vincent neighbourhood in Hamilton is named after him. It is bounded by King Street East (north), Greenhill Avenue (south), Mount Albion (west) and Quigley Road (east). Landmarks in this neighbourhood include Greenhill Park, Laurier Park and Bishop Ryan Catholic Secondary School.

Military offices
Preceded by Sir John Hamilton, 1st Baronet, of Woodbrook	Colonel of the 69th (South Lincolnshire) Regiment of Foot; 1836–1848	Succeeded by Sir Ralph Darling
