= Fort Towson =

- U.S. National Register of Historic Places
- U.S. Historic district
- Location within Oklahoma Location within the United States
- Location: Choctaw County, Oklahoma, USA
- Nearest city: Fort Towson, Oklahoma
- Coordinates: 34°1′40″N 95°15′23″W
- Built: 1830
- NRHP reference No.: 70000531
- Added to NRHP: September 29, 1970

Fort Towson was a frontier outpost for Frontier Army Quartermasters along the Permanent Indian Frontier located about two miles (3 km) northeast of the present community of Fort Towson, Oklahoma. Located on Gates Creek near the confluence of the Kiamichi River and the Red River in present-day Choctaw County, Oklahoma, it was named for General Nathaniel Towson.

== Early history ==
Fort Towson was established in May 1824, under Col. Matthew Arbuckle, on the southern edge of Indian Territory to guard the border with Spanish colonial territory to the south. It was named for Nathaniel Towson, Paymaster General of the Army. It was originally called "Cantonment Towson." A military trace was constructed in the 1820s as a wagon trail to connect the fort to other military forts in Arkansas. The fort was abandoned in April 1829, and the garrison moved to Fort Jessup. The cantonment was intended only as a temporary facility, having nothing but tents and a few wooden shacks.

=== Reestablishment and Choctaw relocation ===
In November 1830, the Army ordered the construction of a permanent fort in the area, as it had been assigned for the relocation of the Choctaw from present-day what became Mississippi, under the Indian Removal Act. A new site was chosen about 6 miles (9.7 km) from the original site. The new fort was reestablished as "Camp Phoenix" to protect the Choctaw Nation. It was renamed as Fort Towson in 1831. Gradually a settlement developed around it.

== Fort description ==
The new Fort Towson was much more substantial. The north side was atop the bluffs of Gates Creek. The fort occupied a rectangle containing about half an acre. The officers' quarters consisted of three buildings on the north side of the rectangle. These structures were built of logs, 1.5 stories tall, with 3 feet (0.91 m) limestone foundations and covered porches facing south. Four other buildings were located on two sides of the rectangle, facing each other. These were one story high, but had higher foundations, effectively creating basements.

Those closest to the officers' quarters were a combination of sub-officers' quarters, quartermaster's office, amusement parlor, and school room. The last two buildings were barracks for common soldiers. The kitchens and dining halls were in the basements. All the buildings were painted white. The square in front of the buildings served as a parade ground. A hospital building was on the east side, about 250 feet (76 m) from the last barracks building. Stables, shops and gardens were outside the rectangle on the east. The sutler's building, the dairy and poultry yards were outside the rectangle on the west. The cemetery was about 300 yards (270 m) farther west.

== Conversion to Choctaw Agency ==
After the construction of Fort Washita 70 miles (110 km) to the west in 1842, Fort Towson lost importance. It was garrisoned until June 1854. At that time, it was turned over to the use of the Choctaw Indian Agency, then run by Indian Agent Douglas H. Cooper. A storm in the same month blew the roofs off several buildings and did some other damage to the facility. A few years later, a fire destroyed all of the buildings except one of the barracks and the hospital. The remaining facilities are now managed by the Oklahoma Historical Society.

== Civil War and abandonment ==
At the beginning of the American Civil War, the Confederacy took over the remaining buildings of the fort. They had created an alliance with the Choctaw, promising them and other tribes a state of their own if the Confederacy won their war. The fort was used as the headquarters of Confederate General Samuel B. Maxey. The last remaining Confederate Army troops were commanded by General Stand Watie (Cherokee), a principal chief of his nation until the end of the war. He surrendered to Union forces at Fort Towson on June 23, 1865.

The post was abandoned at the close of the Civil War. Soldiers buried in the cemetery were moved to Fort Gibson. The buildings fell into ruin and foundation stones were hauled off by local residents to be used for other buildings.

=== Legacy and historic designation ===
The location of the fort is designated as an Oklahoma Historic Site. It was added to the National Register of Historic Places (#70000531) in 1970.

== Sources ==
- Morrison, W.B. "Fort Towson", Chronicles of Oklahoma 8:2 (June 1930) 226-232 (retrieved August 16, 2006).
- Morrison, W.B. "The Location of Cantonment Towsen—A Correction". Chronicles of Oklahoma 8:3 (September 1930) 255-256 (retrieved August 16, 2006).
- Rodriguez, Junius P. . "The Louisiana Purchase: a historical and geographical encyclopedia" (2002) 334-335 (retrieved September 10, 2009).
