= John Chandler =

American politician and soldier (1762–1841)

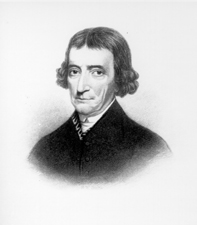

United States Senator from Maine
- In office June 14, 1820 – March 3, 1829
- Preceded by: inaugural holder
- Succeeded by: Peleg Sprague

1st President of the Maine Senate
- In office March 15, 1820 – June 19, 1820
- Preceded by: inaugural holder
- Succeeded by: William Moody

Member of the U.S. House of Representatives from Massachusetts's 17th district
- In office March 4, 1805 – March 3, 1809
- Preceded by: Phineas Bruce
- Succeeded by: Barzillai Gannett

Member of the Massachusetts Senate
- In office 1803–1805

Personal details
- Born: February 1, 1762 Epping, Province of New Hampshire, British America
- Died: September 25, 1841 (aged 79) Augusta, Maine, U.S.
- Resting place: Mount Pleasant Cemetery
- Party: Democratic-Republican; Jacksonian
- Spouse: Mary Whittier (m. 1783)
- Children: three sons, four daughters

Military service
- Allegiance: Massachusetts; United States
- Branch/service: Massachusetts State Militia; Continental Army; United States Army
- Rank: Major General (Mass. Militia); Brigadier General (U.S. Army)
- Commands: Massachusetts State Militia; 17th Division
- Battles/wars: American Revolutionary War; War of 1812: Battle of Stoney Creek

John Chandler (February 1, 1762 – September 25, 1841) was an American politician and soldier of Maine. The political career of Chandler, a Democratic-Republican, was interspersed with his involvement in the state militia during both the American Revolutionary War and the War of 1812.

== Biography ==
=== Family background ===
Chandler was born in Epping in the Province of New Hampshire. He was one of 69 children and the third-oldest son of Joseph Chandler (1725–1776) and his wife Lydia (née Eastman; 1726–1820). His father Joseph was a blacksmith. He fought in the French and Indian War and was a captain in the Revolutionary War. He died at Mount Independence in 1776.

=== American Revolutionary War ===
Chandler was self-educated and enlisted in the Continental Army at age 15. In the same year he was captured by the British, but he soon escaped. In May 1779 he was captured again. In September, he was able to escape and made his way back to Epping. Immediately he reenlisted in the Continental Army. During the war he had become the protégé of General Henry Dearborn, (1751–1829), a future fifth U.S. Secretary of War (1801–1809), who was also an important commander of the Northeast sector at Fort Detroit, in the Old Northwest Territory, but a terrible failure during the War of 1812.

On August 27, 1783, Chandler married Mary Whittier, with whom he had seven children (three sons and four daughters).

=== Politician in Massachusetts ===
After the end of the war, Chandler was without money. However, he borrowed money from Dearborn and bought a farm near Monmouth in the District of Maine, then a part of Massachusetts. He settled there with his family in 1784. A local schoolmaster gave him all the support he needed to catch up on his schooling quickly. He worked hard as a blacksmith, prospered over the years and became a respected member of the community.

From 1803 to 1805, Chandler served in the Massachusetts Senate; he later was elected to the U.S. House of Representatives as a Democratic-Republican, serving from March 4, 1805, to March 3, 1809. Chandler was not a candidate for renomination in 1808. In the same year he was appointed Sheriff of Kennebec County. On February 27, 1812, he became major general of the Massachusetts Militia.

=== War of 1812 ===
At the outbreak of the War of 1812, President James Madison appointed Chandler to the command of the 17th division. This was a brigade of U.S. Volunteers, troops recruited for one year of service. At this moment he was still major general of the Massachusetts Militia. On July 8, 1812, he resigned his militia office and was commissioned as a brigadier general of the United States Army. The first part of the war he was serving under Major General Henry Dearborn as the commander of one of three brigades of the Army of the North.

At the beginning of June 1813 he accompanied Brigadier General William H. Winder during the Niagara campaign on an advance into Canada. At the Battle of Stoney Creek Chandler was wounded, and both he and Winder were captured by Sgt. Alexander Fraser , when they wandered into the British line, thinking it was their own. In 1814 he was set free in an exchange of prisoners. Chandler subsequently served defending the coast of New Hampshire and Maine, coordinating efforts between the local militia and federal units. After the war ended, he returned to politics as a member of the Massachusetts General Court in 1819.

=== Later years ===
Chandler was the first president of the Maine Senate and a member of the Maine Constitutional Convention. Upon the admission of Maine to the Union, Chandler was elected to the U.S. Senate. Chandler began his term on June 14, 1820, and was reelected in 1823. During his time in the Senate, Chandler was the chairman of the Committee on Militia during the 18th through 20th Congresses and played a key role in establishing the arsenal at Augusta, as well as the construction of the military road from Bangor to Houlton. He resigned on March 3, 1829, to become the customs collector of Portland, a post he held until 1837. Chandler was a trustee of Bowdoin College from 1821 - 1838. He died in Augusta at age 79 and was buried in Mount Pleasant Cemetery.

== See also ==
- Chandler's Wharf, which is named for Chandler

U.S. House of Representatives
Preceded by none-new position	Member of the U.S. House of Representatives from Massachusetts's 17th congressional district (Maine district); March 4, 1805 – March 3, 1809	Succeeded by Barzillai Gannett
U.S. Senate
Preceded by none-new office	U.S. senator (Class 2) from Maine; 1820–1829; Served alongside: John Holmes, Albion K. Parris	Succeeded by Peleg Sprague
Political offices
Preceded by None	1st President of the Maine Senate; 1820	Succeeded by William Moody
