= Battle of Fort George =

1813 battle of the War of 1812

Coordinates: 43.250752°N 79.061111°W

- Part of the War of 1812
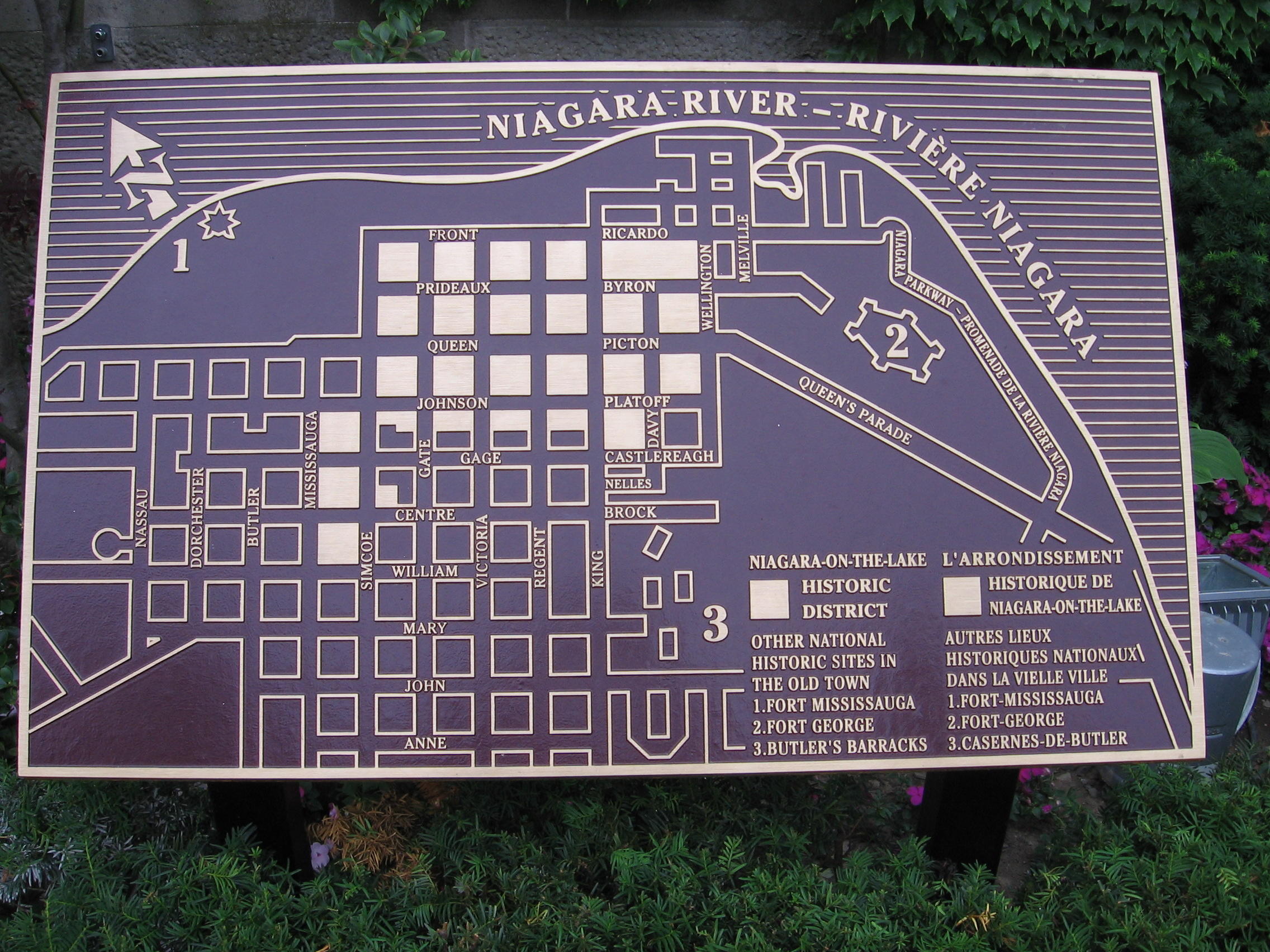
- A historical marker, featuring Fort George. (#2)
Date	May 25–27, 1813
Location	Present day Niagara on the Lake, Ontario
Result	American victory

Belligerents
United Kingdom; Upper Canada	United States

Commanders and leaders
John Vincent	Henry Dearborn; Winfield Scott; Oliver Hazard Perry; Morgan Lewis

Strength
1,000 regular infantry, 300 militia, 50 natives, 5 field guns	4,000 regular infantry, 1 corvette, 1 brig-of-war, 12 gunboats, Several batteries

Casualties and losses
52–107 dead 147–175 wounded 276–280 captured (including 147–175 of the wounded)	40–111 dead 111–192 wounded

National Historic Site of Canada
- Official name: Battlefield of Fort George National Historic Site of Canada
- Designated: 1921

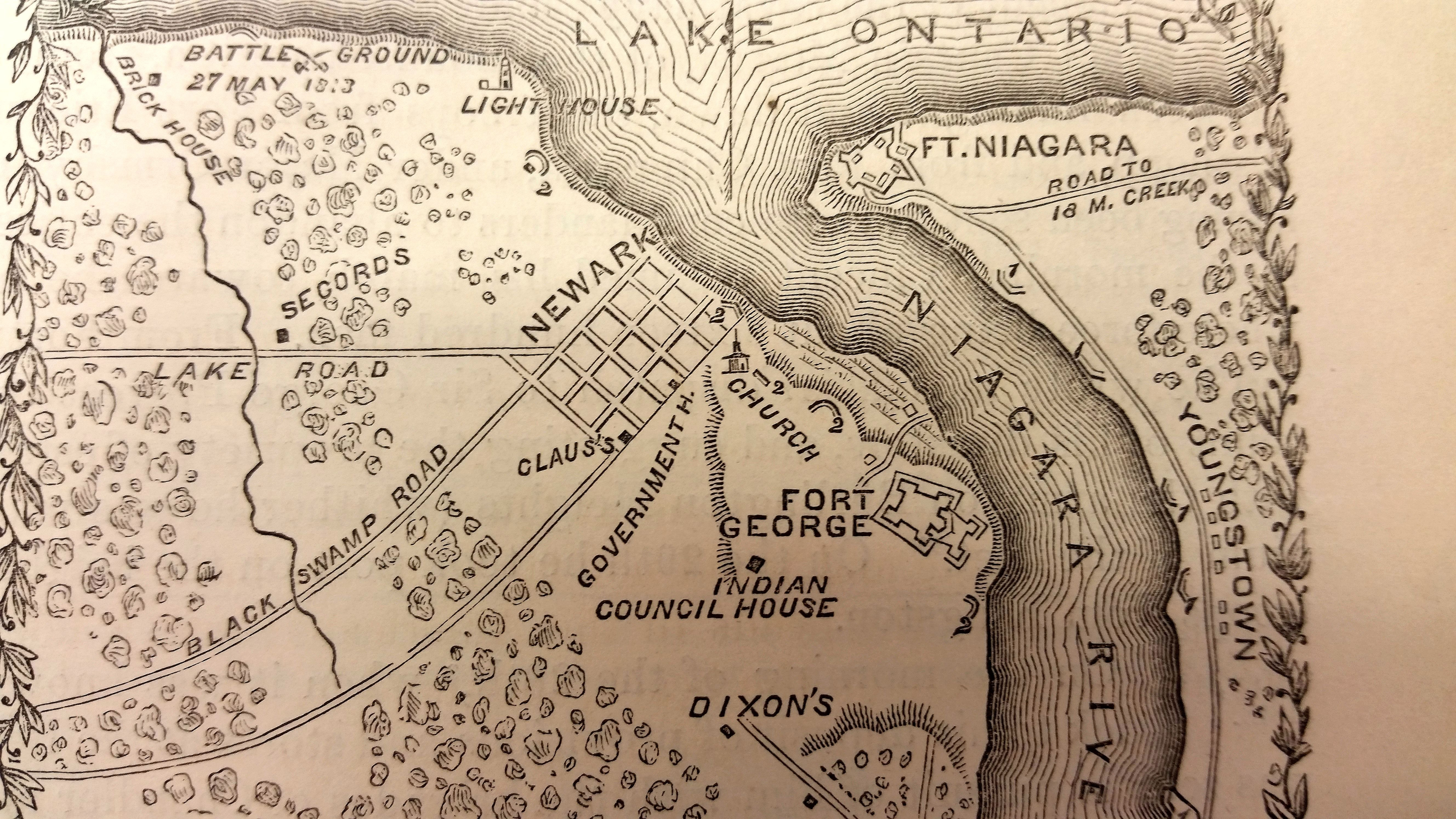
Battle of Fort George

The Battle of Fort George was fought during the War of 1812, in which the Americans defeated a British force and captured Fort George in Upper Canada. The troops of the United States Army and vessels of the United States Navy cooperated in a very successful amphibious assault, although most of the opposing British force escaped encirclement.

== Background ==
Fort George was the westernmost of the British fortified posts on Lake Ontario, the others being York, the provincial capital of Upper Canada, and Kingston where most of the ships of the Provincial Marine were based. The fort was situated on the western bank of the Niagara River near its mouth. On the American side of the river lay Fort Niagara. Fort George was constructed to replace and counterbalance Fort Niagara, which the British lost to the Americans after Jay's Treaty of 1796.

== Events in 1812 ==
At the beginning of the war both the British forces near Fort George and the American forces at Fort Niagara felt unprepared for conflict. On May 18, 1812, Sir George Prevost, the Governor General of the Canadas, wrote a letter in response to the Secretary of State for War and the Colonies who was inquiring about the military situation in Canada. He stated that there were 400 soldiers of the 41st Regiment and a Captain's Command of Artillery stationed at Fort George. He also wrote that he felt Fort George would not be able to withstand an attack by the Americans if they came with a considerable force. On the American side, Colonel Philetus Swift and Benjamin Barton wrote before the war to the Governor of New York, Daniel Tompkins, that Fort Niagara would fall to the British if a war were to be declared. By July 1812 however, the American commander at Fort Niagara was expecting a British attack and was demanding more reinforcements.

On October 8, 1812, Major General Stephen Van Rensselaer of the New York state militia outlined a plan of attack to send a militia force from Lewiston to attack Queenston which would force the British to send soldiers from Fort George to Queenston. When that happened, a force of U.S. Regulars commanded by Brigadier General Alexander Smyth were to travel by boat from Four Mile Creek to the rear of Fort George and capture the fort. This plan failed to materialize, in part because Smyth failed to cooperate. An attempt to carry out the plan on the night of October 10/11 was thwarted by bad weather. Smyth marched his detachment back to Black Rock, New York.

Van Rensselaer attacked Queenston with the troops he had at Lewiston on the night of October 13/14, without Smyth's troops. During the ensuing Battle of Queenston Heights, the guns of Fort George and Fort Niagara began to fire at the opposite fort. During the exchange the Americans set fire to the court house, jail, and fifteen or sixteen other buildings. During this battle Fort George was left under the control of Major Thomas Evans and there were no more than twenty soldiers acting as the main guards.

== American plans ==
The Americans drafted a new plan on February 10, 1813. The plan was to attack Kingston, then York from Sackets Harbor with 4,000 soldiers. Only then were they to assault Fort George. Simultaneously 3,000 soldiers from Buffalo, New York, were to capture Fort Erie then march on Fort George. This plan was changed to avoid Kingston because Major General Henry Dearborn, commander of the United States armies on the frontier with Canada, believed false reports that there were 6,000 to 8,000 British soldiers at Kingston.

On April 27, the Americans on Lake Ontario under Dearborn and Commodore Isaac Chauncey gained success at the Battle of York, occupying the town for several days and capturing many guns and stores, although Brigadier General Zebulon Pike and several dozen soldiers were killed by an exploding magazine. The American army was then transported across the lake in Chauncey's ships to Fort Niagara. Dearborn planned to attack Fort George next, but his army required rest and reorganisation. No preparations had been made to accommodate the troops at Fort Niagara, and they suffered considerable shortages and privations for several days. In particular, the wounded were left without shelter or medical attention.

On May 15, Colonel Winfield Scott took up his appointment as Dearborn's Adjutant General (i.e. Chief of Staff), having been exchanged after being captured at the Battle of Queenston Heights in the previous year. (The British maintained that Scott had only been paroled pending an exchange, and protested when he took up the appointment.) Scott improved the army's administration and pushed forward the plans for the forthcoming attack. At the same time, Master Commandant Oliver Hazard Perry of the United States Navy, who had arrived from Lake Erie to request sailors and supplies for his squadron and was temporarily serving as one of Chauncey's senior officers, reconnoitred the landing sites at the mouth of the Niagara River, taking bearings and placing marker buoys.

At Fort George, the Americans planned to land on the shore of the lake rather than on the shore of the Niagara River. The troops would be supported as they landed by twelve schooners, each mounting one or more heavy cannon, which could approach the shore closely. Two larger vessels, the corvette Madison and the brig Oneida, would engage the nearest British batteries.

The American army numbered approximately 4,000 regular infantry. The force was divided into four waves, which would land in succession. The first wave was to be commanded by Scott himself, the second by Brigadier General John Parker Boyd, a professional soldier, and the third by Brigadier General William H. Winder, a recently commissioned lawyer. A brigade under a political appointee, Brigadier General John Chandler, formed the reserve, with most of the artillery under Colonel Alexander Macomb. The Army's second-in-command, Major General Morgan Lewis, was nominally in overall command of the landing force. Dearborn, the commander in chief, would observe from aboard Madison.

As the American preparations proceeded, on May 25 they began to bombard Fort George from their positions along the river and from Fort Niagara, and also from Chauncey's schooners. The gunners in the fort and the nearby batteries were using cannonballs which had been heated in furnaces until they were red-hot, then quickly loaded into cannons and fired. Several log buildings within Fort George burned down, and the women and children in the fort were forced to take shelter within the bastions.

== British situation ==
The commander of the British forces on the Niagara peninsula was Brigadier General John Vincent. He had 1,000 regular soldiers (the bulk of the 1st battalion of the 8th (King's) Regiment and the 49th Regiment, with detachments of the Royal Newfoundland Fencibles and the Glengarry Light Infantry). There were also up to 300 militia present, including Captain Runchey's Company of Coloured Men.

Although Vincent knew that an assault was imminent, he could not know from which direction it would come. To try to cover the entire threatened front, he split his regulars into three detachments and would counterattack the Americans when they landed. Most regulars were placed on the Niagara River, assuming that the Americans would attack under cover of their guns in Fort Niagara.

== Battle ==
The attack, however, did not come along the Niagara River. Just after dawn on May 27, an early morning fog dispersed to reveal the American vessels off the lake shore to the west. Vincent believed he saw 14 or 15 vessels and 90 to 100 large boats and scows each with 50 or 60 soldiers. Scott's troops began landing west of the mouth of the Niagara River, while Perry's schooners silenced the nearby British batteries. Scott's force consisted of the U.S. 1st Rifle Regiment under Major Benjamin Forsyth, two companies of the U.S. 15th Infantry and the bulk of the U.S. 2nd Artillery, fighting as infantry. A company of the Glengarry Light Infantry charged the Americans with the bayonet as they waded ashore. Winfield Scott had to personally fight off a Glengarry soldier while falling into the water. The Glengarry company was outnumbered and forced to retreat, losing half their men. A company of the Royal Newfoundland also attacked but took heavy casualties from grapeshot fired by the schooners.

Scott advanced from the beach but was counter-attacked by British troops (the remnants of the troops which had already engaged Scott, plus five companies of the 8th (King's), Runchey's company and 100 other militia) which had been concentrated in a ravine out of the American fire. Scott was driven back, but once again the fire from Perry's schooners caused heavy losses among the British. Scott's force was reinforced by the leading troops of Boyd's brigade, which was just landing, and the British were driven back in turn.

As Winder's brigade also began landing, Vincent realized that he was outnumbered and outflanked and decided to evacuate his soldiers before they were completely encircled. He ordered an immediate retreat south to Queenston. Although he ordered the fort's guns to be spiked and the magazines to be blown up, the task was so hastily performed and Scott pursued so closely that the Americans were able to secure the fort substantially intact. One small magazine did explode, and the blast threw Scott from his horse and broke his collarbone. (Some British women and children had been left behind in the fort in the hasty retreat and would have suffered heavy casualties if the demolitions had proceeded as Vincent ordered.)

Scott continued to press after Vincent and the American batteries bombarded the retreating British from the other side of the river. Vincent's rearguards, including Merritt's Troop of Provincial Dragoons, held off Scott although several stragglers were captured. However, the American plan had allowed for only two companies of light dragoons commanded by Colonel James Burn to cross the Niagara 5 miles (8.0 km) above Fort George cut off Vincent's retreat. The dragoons were delayed in their crossing by a British battery, and Burn cautiously waited for both companies to assemble before moving against Vincent, by which time Scott had reached Burn's position. As Scott waited for the American dragoons to reorganise before pressing on again, Brigadier General Boyd brought him orders from Major General Lewis to abandon the pursuit and return to Fort George. Lewis feared that the British would lead Scott into an ambush.

== Casualties ==
The U.S. Army lost one officer and 39 enlisted men killed and five officers and 106 other ranks wounded; for a total of 40 killed and 111 wounded. Most of the casualties were in Boyd's 1st Brigade. The 2nd Brigade under William Winder saw comparatively light fighting, and only 6 of its men were wounded. The New York Volunteers had 4 men wounded. The 3rd Brigade under Chandler, the last to arrive, suffered no casualties, while the U.S. Navy lost one killed and two wounded. Richard Feltoe gives much higher casualties of 111 killed and 192 wounded.

The British official casualty return, for the regular troops only, gave 52 killed, 44 wounded and 262 missing; also mentioning that 16 men who had been "wounded on former occasions" had been left behind in the Fort George military hospital and were not included in the casualty total. The detachment of the (local) Lincoln Militia who fought at the battle lost 5 officers and 80 other ranks, although only four of these seem to have been killed. According to their official report, the Americans took 276 prisoners, 163 of whom were wounded. General Boyd offered his own personal tally - 107 killed, according to his burial parties, with 175 wounded brought in and another 105 unwounded prisoners. The wounded prisoners would have included the 16 wounded patients captured in the Fort George hospital. Including these 16 as unwounded prisoners (because they were captured at this engagement but received their wounds in earlier ones), the total British casualties were 183 killed, wounded or deserted; 147 wounded prisoners and 129 unwounded prisoners; adding up to a loss of 459 men.

== Results ==
The Americans had inflicted heavy casualties and captured a strongly fortified position with fewer losses to themselves. The victory can be credited to excellent planning and leadership by two comparatively junior officers: Scott and Perry.

When the Americans broke off the pursuit, Vincent continued his retreat to Beaver Dams, near present-day Thorold, Ontario, where he gathered in the other British regular detachments from Fort Erie and other posts higher up the Niagara, and temporarily disbanded the militia, before falling back to Burlington Heights near the western end of Lake Ontario.

When the British abandoned Fort Erie, Perry was able to move several armed schooners which had been blockaded in Black Rock into Lake Erie, and these were to be instrumental in his victory later in the year in the Battle of Lake Erie. However, the American army was slow to exploit the capture of Fort George by advancing up the Niagara peninsula, and they allowed Vincent to launch a surprise attack at the Battle of Stoney Creek, after which the Americans withdrew to Fort George. By concentrating their naval squadron against Fort George, the Americans had also left themselves vulnerable to a counter-attack on their base, and only indecisive command by Lieutenant General Sir George Prevost allowed the Americans to fight him off at the Battle of Sackett's Harbor.

The Americans subsequently remained in a small defensive enclave around Fort George. After a disaster when a sortie against a British outpost was surrounded and forced to surrender by Native Americans at the Battle of Beaver Dams, they remained largely inactive on this front until they abandoned Fort George in December 1813.

Ten currently active regular battalions of the United States Army (2-1 ADA, 3-4 ADA, 4-1 FA, 1-2 Inf, 2-2 Inf, 1-4 Inf, 2-4 Inf, 3-4 Inf, 1-5 Inf and 2-5 Inf) perpetuate the lineages of a number of American units (Crane's Company, 3rd Regiment of Artillery, Baker's Company, 2nd Regiment of Artillery, Leonard's Company, 1st Regiment of Artillery, and the old 6th, 13th, 14th, 20th, 21st, 22nd and 23rd Infantry Regiments) that were engaged at Fort George.

== Commemoration ==
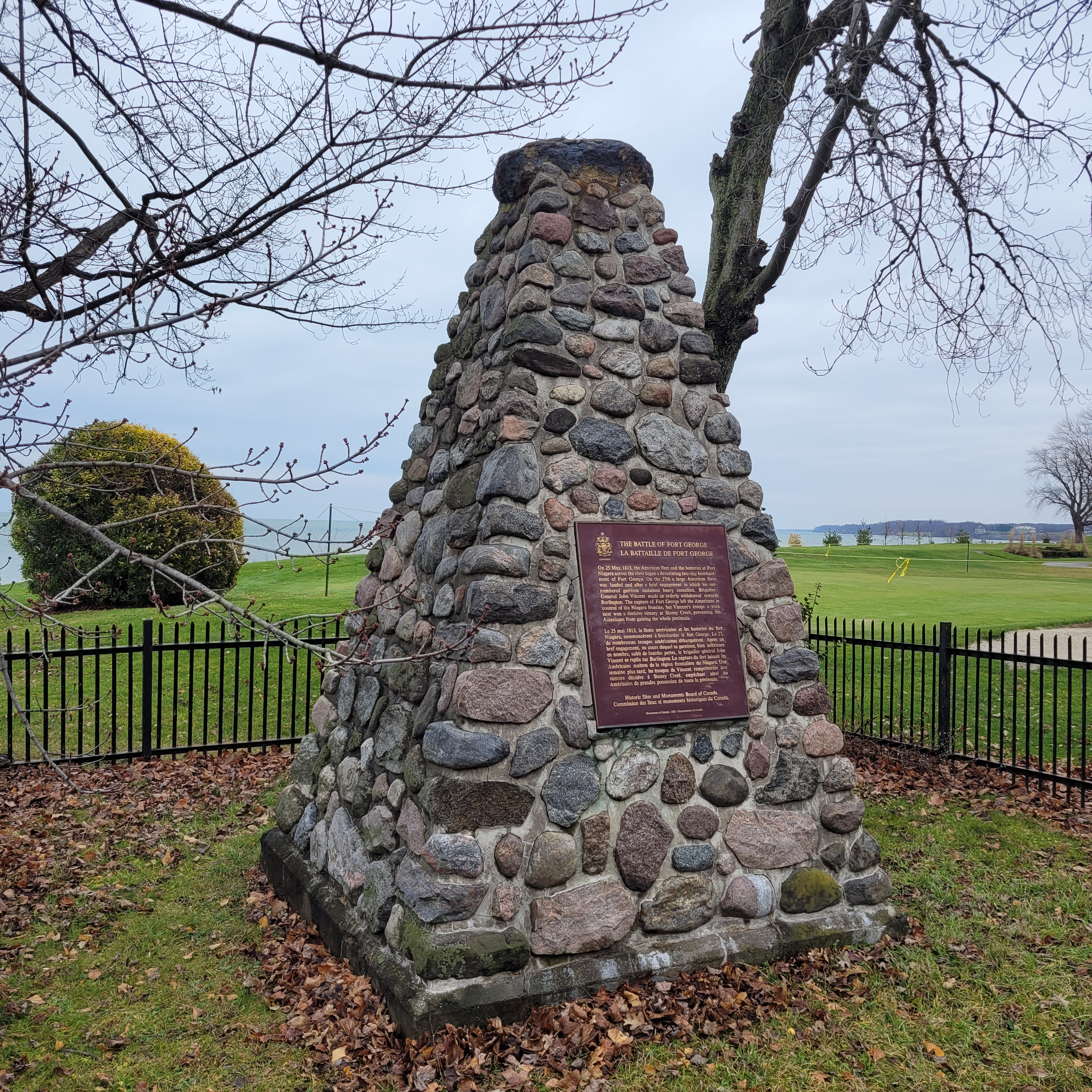
The cairn and the plaque marking the battlefield of Fort George National Historic Site

The battlefield site was designated a National Historic Site of Canada in 1921. Nearby Fort George was similarly designated that same year.

== Orders of battle ==
British order of battle	American order of battle
Centre Division: Brigadier General John Vincent: General Headquarters; Deputy Adjutant General: Lt Colonel John Harvey; Asst. Quartermaster General: Lt Colonel Christopher Myers; British Regular Units; 1st Battalion, 8th (The King's) Regiment of Foot (5 companies); 49th Regiment of Foot; Royal Artillery; Canadian Regular Units; Royal Newfoundland Fencibles, 2 companies; Glengarry Light Infantry, 3 companies; Canadian Militia; Merritt's Troop (volunteer cavalry); Lincoln Militia Infantry; Captain Runchey's Company of Coloured Men; Militia Artillery, 1 company	Army of the North: Major General Henry Dearborn: Division of the Niagara: Major General Morgan Lewis; General Staff and Headquarters; Quartermaster General: Brigadier General Robert Swartwout; Asst. Adjutant General: Colonel Winfield Scott; Siege Train: Colonel Moses Porter; 1st U.S. Riflemen: Major Benjamin Forsyth; 1st Brigade: Brigadier General John Parker Boyd; 6th U.S. Infantry: Col Jonas Simonds; 15th U.S. Infantry; 16th U.S. Infantry; U.S. Light Artillery: Maj. Abraham Eustis; 2nd Brigade: Brigadier General John Chandler; 9th U.S. Infantry; 21st U.S. Infantry; 25th U.S. Infantry; 3rd U.S. Artillery: Col. Alexander Macomb; 3rd Brigade: Brigadier General William H. Winder; 5th U.S. Infantry; 13th U.S. Infantry; 14th U.S. Infantry; 2nd U.S. Artillery: Cpt. Nathaniel Towson; Lake Ontario Fleet: Commodore Isaac Chauncey: 1 corvette; 1 brig-of-war; 12 gunboats
