= Nathaniel Towson =

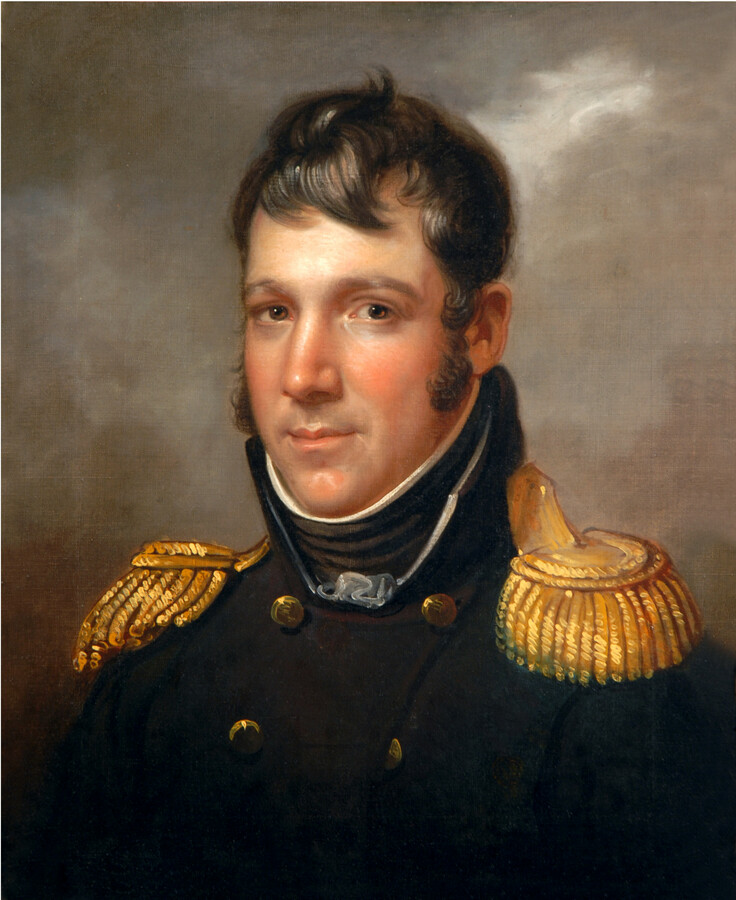
- Towson in uniform, 1813
- Born: January 22, 1784; Towson, Maryland, U.S.
- Died: July 20, 1854 (aged 70) Washington, D.C., U.S.
- Buried: Oak Hill Cemetery; Washington, D.C., U.S.
- Allegiance: United States
- Branch: United States Army
- Service years: 1812-1854
- Rank: Colonel; Brevet Major General
- Commands: 2nd U.S. Artillery
- Conflicts: War of 1812; Battle of Fort George; Battle of Stoney Creek; Battle of Queenston Heights; Battle of Chippawa; Battle of Lundy's Lane; Siege of Fort Erie; Mexican–American War

Nathaniel Towson (/ˈtaʊzən/; January 22, 1784 – July 20, 1854), also known as Nathan Towson, was a brevet major general in the United States Army. A career soldier, he fought in the War of 1812 as an artillery officer. He served as paymaster of the Army after the war, and was brevetted to brigadier general and major general for his service during the Mexican–American War.

== History ==
Nathaniel Towson was born in Towson, Maryland, which was then a small town north of Baltimore. Towson farmed for much of his early life and left his hometown to establish his family's recently acquired farm in Kentucky. Because of a land dispute, he moved to Natchez, Mississippi.

=== Military career ===
While in Natchez, Towson joined a volunteer artillery outfit to accompany the first American governor of Louisiana, William C. C. Claiborne, to New Orleans. Towson quelled an attempted mass desertion and quickly rose through the ranks until he finally commanded the Natchez Volunteer Artillery. In 1805, He returned to Baltimore County and continued farming but remained a military officer through his position with the Maryland Militia. His military prowess earned him recognition in the Maryland Militia and he became Adjutant of its 7th Regiment. During this period prior to the War of 1812, Towson became an astute artillery officer and devoted significant efforts to artillery's related study of mathematics. He also became an adviser to the state during its revision of the militia laws.

=== War of 1812 ===
With American and British tensions escalating, Towson was appointed captain in the United States Army artillery on March 15, 1812. His service during the War of 1812 began with a notable success. His first engagement involved his commanding a small group to capture a British brig, HMS Caledonia. The successful capture propelled Towson's reputation. He quickly rose through the ranks, both through his own acts of individual bravery and his effective artillery command. While commanding relatively few artillery pieces, his batteries' discharges were so numerous that his position during the Siege of Fort Erie became known as "Towson's Lighthouse". During the War of 1812, he commanded artillery during many confrontations, including the Battle of Fort George, the Battle of Stoney Creek, the Battle of Queenston Heights, the Battle of Chippawa, the Battle of Lundy's Lane, and the Siege of Fort Erie.

=== Post war ===
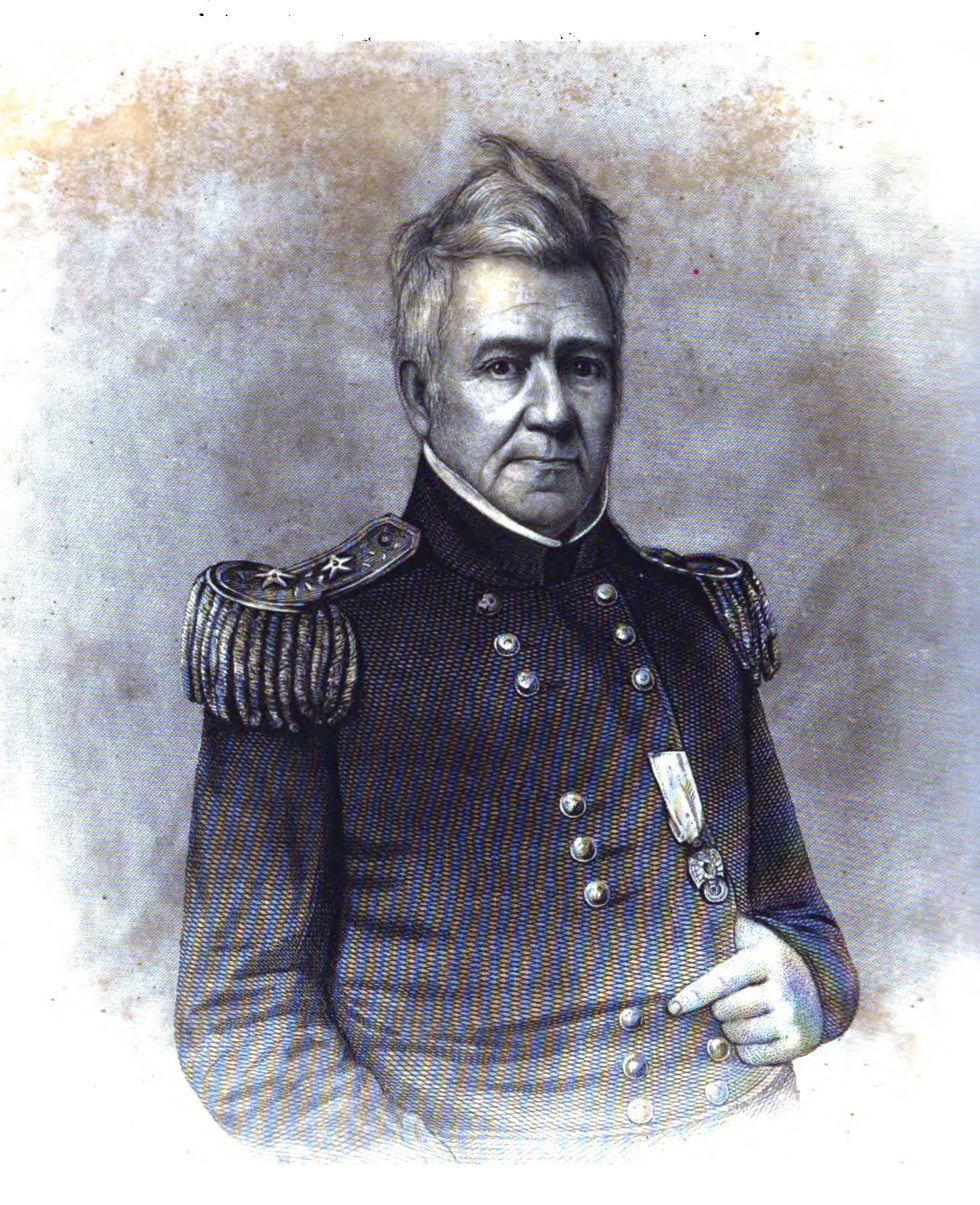
Brevet Major General Nathan Towson

After the War, Towson was assigned to a command Fort Independence in Boston and then Fort Wolcott in Newport, Rhode Island. He was then appointed Paymaster-General of the United States Army in 1819 and was promoted to colonel on June 1, 1821. As Paymaster General, Towson resided primarily in Washington, D.C. Towson received a brevet (honorary promotion) to brigadier general on June 30, 1834, and another to major general on May 30, 1848, for his services during the Mexican War. Towson died while on active duty on July 20, 1854, after serving 42 years in the army. He was buried at Oak Hill Cemetery in Washington, D.C. Towson was succeeded as Paymaster-General by Col. Benjamin Larned, who served in that post until his death in 1862.

=== Societies ===
During the 1820s, Towson was a member of the prestigious society, the Columbian Institute for the Promotion of Arts and Sciences, which counted among its members former presidents Andrew Jackson and John Quincy Adams as well as many prominent men of the day, including well-known representatives of the military, government service, medical and other professions.

In 1831 he was admitted as an honorary member of the Maryland Society of the Cincinnati.

== Namesakes ==
- A U.S. military outpost was renamed Fort Towson in 1831. It is located in Fort Towson, Oklahoma.
- An American World War II liberty ship was named SS Nathan Towson.
- Towson High School (in his hometown) named its mascot the "Generals".
- Towson Avenue, a major thoroughfare in Fort Smith, Arkansas.
- Towson University, a public Maryland university
