= 2nd Regiment of Light Dragoons (United States) =

- Active: 1812 — 1814
- Disbanded: May 12, 1814
- Country: United States
- Branch: United States Army
- Type: Dragoons
- Size: Regiment
- Weapons: Sabers; Pistols
- Campaigns: War of 1812: Raid at Mississinewa; Siege of Fort Meigs; Battle of Fort George; Battle of the Thames; Skirmish at Doran's Farm

Commanders
- Sole Commander: James Burn

The 2nd Regiment of Light Dragoons was a unit of the U.S. Army in the early nineteenth century. It was first activated in 1812. The regiment was consolidated with the 1st Regiment of Light Dragoons on May 12, 1814, forming the Regiment of Light Dragoons.

== Background ==
An act of Congress on January 11, 1812 authorized an additional regiment of light Dragoons. By June 1812, the regiment had been activated.

== Organization ==
Although the regiment was organized on January 11, 1812 the regimental colonel, James Burn, was not appointed until April 25. Secretary of War William Eustis delayed recruiting for almost a month, then allowed recruitment of only three out of twelve companies. No clothing or equipment was supplied until September and October. The regiment was not fully equipped until December. Purchase of horses had been ordered in March but by September only half the regiment was mounted; many of its mounts were unfit for service. Eustis scattered the regiment from the Ohio River to New England. One company disappeared from the War Department's records.

While stationed at Sackett's Harbor, New York, both the 1st and 2nd Regiments had their strength increased by the transfer of soldiers from the 26th Infantry Regiment.

== Service ==
Neither the 1st Regiment nor the 2nd Regiment were used as consolidated units during the War of 1812. Generals frequently used their assigned dragoons as escorts, couriers and scouts rather than fighting men.

William Henry Harrison ordered Colonel John B. Campbell of the 19th Infantry to lead a force which included Major James Ball's squadron (including Captain Samuel Hopkins's troop) of the 2nd Regiment of Light Dragoons from Fort Greenville, Ohio to attack a cluster of Miami Indian villages on the Mississinewa River. On December 17, 1812, Campbell's force attacked and destroyed the principle village. The Miami counterattacked before dawn on December 18 and, although Campbell and his soldiers persevered, they suffered ten dead and thirty-eight wounded. Campbell retreated to Fort Greenville. The expedition suffered the loss of over one hundred horses and more than three hundred men were disabled by frostbite. More than one hundred dragoons were temporary or permanent but non-fatal, casualties. On April 28, 1813, General Procter and Tecumseh attempted to lure U.S. troops, including Major Ball's re-constituted 2nd Squadron into a battle outside Fort Meigs, Ohio. The U.S. forces held their ground inside the fort and the British and Indians broke off he attack.

The regiment participated in the attack on Fort George, Upper Canada in May 1813.

On September 27, 1813, Ball and his dragoons, although dismounted, accompanied Harrison on his invasion of Canada at Amherstburg. The squadron captured a bridge over the Aux Canards River.
