= 1813 =

1813 in various calendars
- Gregorian calendar: 1813; MDCCCXIII
- Ab urbe condita: 2566
- Armenian calendar: 1262; ԹՎ ՌՄԿԲ
- Assyrian calendar: 6563
- Balinese saka calendar: 1734–1735
- Bengali calendar: 1219–1220
- Berber calendar: 2763
- British Regnal year: 53 Geo. 3 – 54 Geo. 3
- Buddhist calendar: 2357
- Burmese calendar: 1175
- Byzantine calendar: 7321–7322
- Chinese calendar: 壬申年 (Water Monkey); 4510 or 4303 — to — 癸酉年 (Water Rooster); 4511 or 4304
- Coptic calendar: 1529–1530
- Discordian calendar: 2979
- Ethiopian calendar: 1805–1806
- Hebrew calendar: 5573–5574
- Hindu calendars
- Vikram Samvat: 1869–1870
- Shaka Samvat: 1734–1735
- Kali Yuga: 4913–4914
- Holocene calendar: 11813
- Igbo calendar: 813–814
- Iranian calendar: 1191–1192
- Islamic calendar: 1227–1229
- Japanese calendar: Bunka 10 (文化１０年)
- Javanese calendar: 1739–1740
- Julian calendar: Gregorian minus 12 days
- Korean calendar: 4146
- Minguo calendar: 99 before ROC 民前99年
- Nanakshahi calendar: 345
- Thai solar calendar: 2355–2356
- Tibetan calendar: ཆུ་ཕོ་སྤྲེ་ལོ་ (male Water-Monkey); 1939 or 1558 or 786 — to — ཆུ་མོ་བྱ་ལོ་ (female Water-Bird); 1940 or 1559 or 787

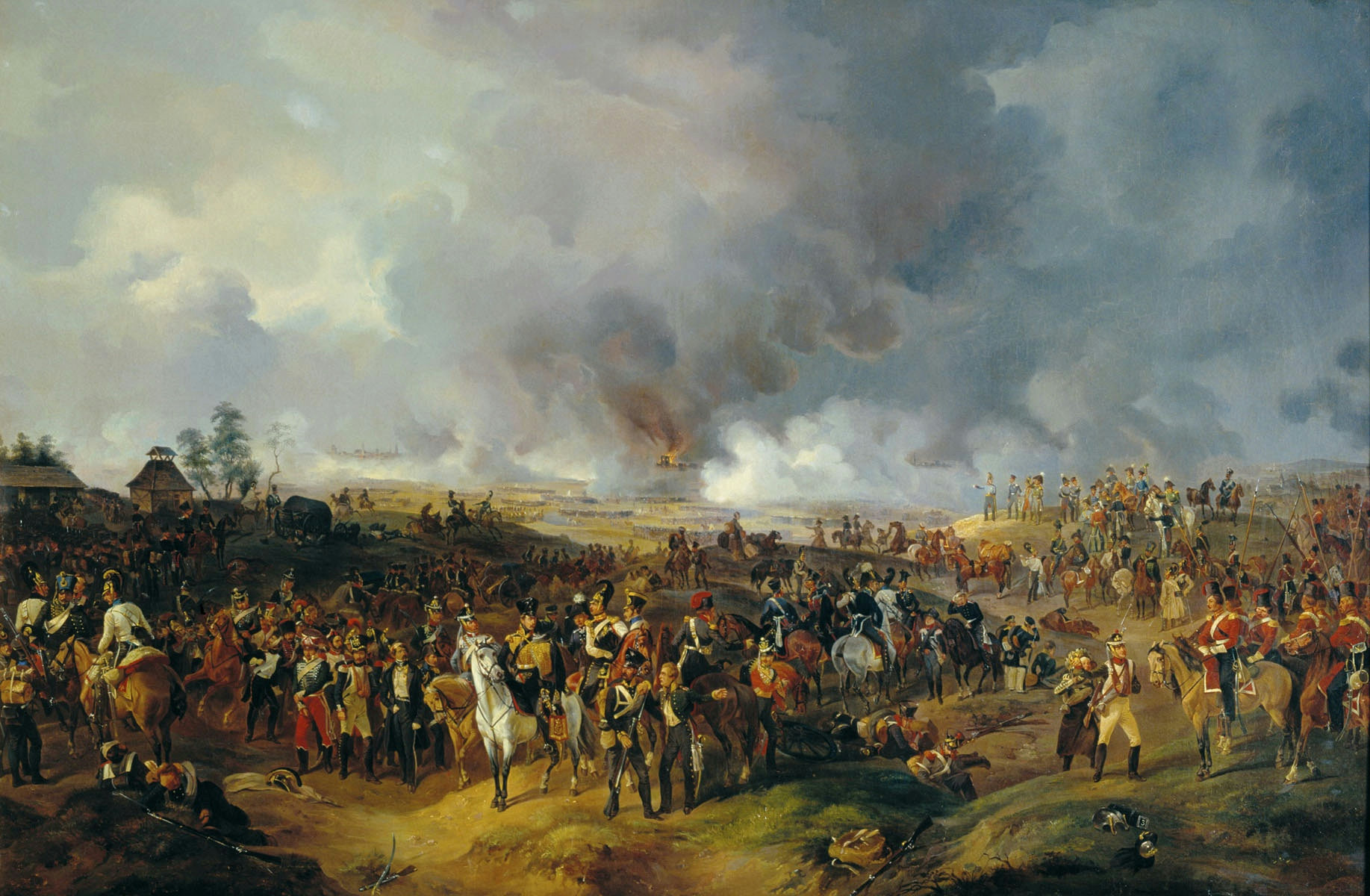
October 16 – 19: Allied forces defeat Napoleon at the Battle of Leipzig.

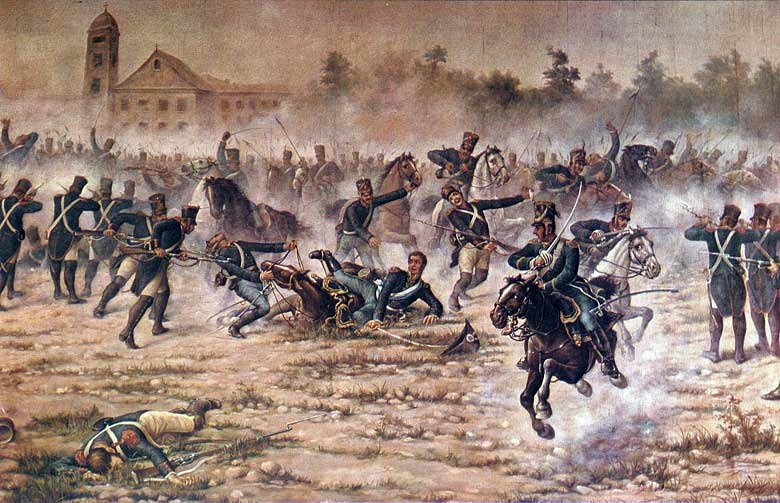
February 3: Battle of San Lorenzo

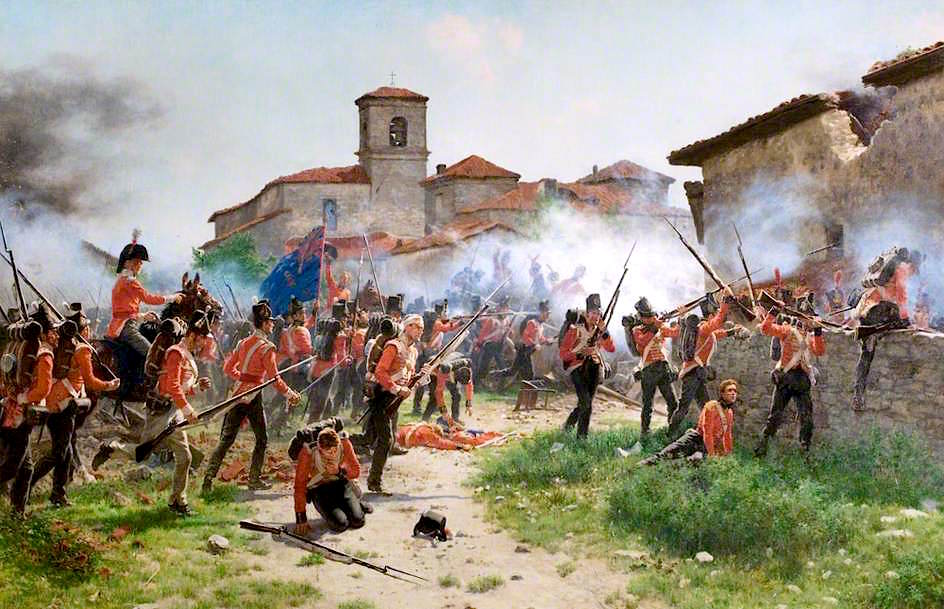
June 21: Battle of Vitoria

1813 (MDCCCXIII) was a common year starting on Friday of the Gregorian calendar and a common year starting on Wednesday of the Julian calendar, the 1813th year of the Common Era (CE) and Anno Domini (AD) designations, the 813th year of the 2nd millennium, the 13th year of the 19th century, and the 4th year of the 1810s decade. As of the start of 1813, the Gregorian calendar was 12 days ahead of the Julian calendar, which remained in localized use until 1923.

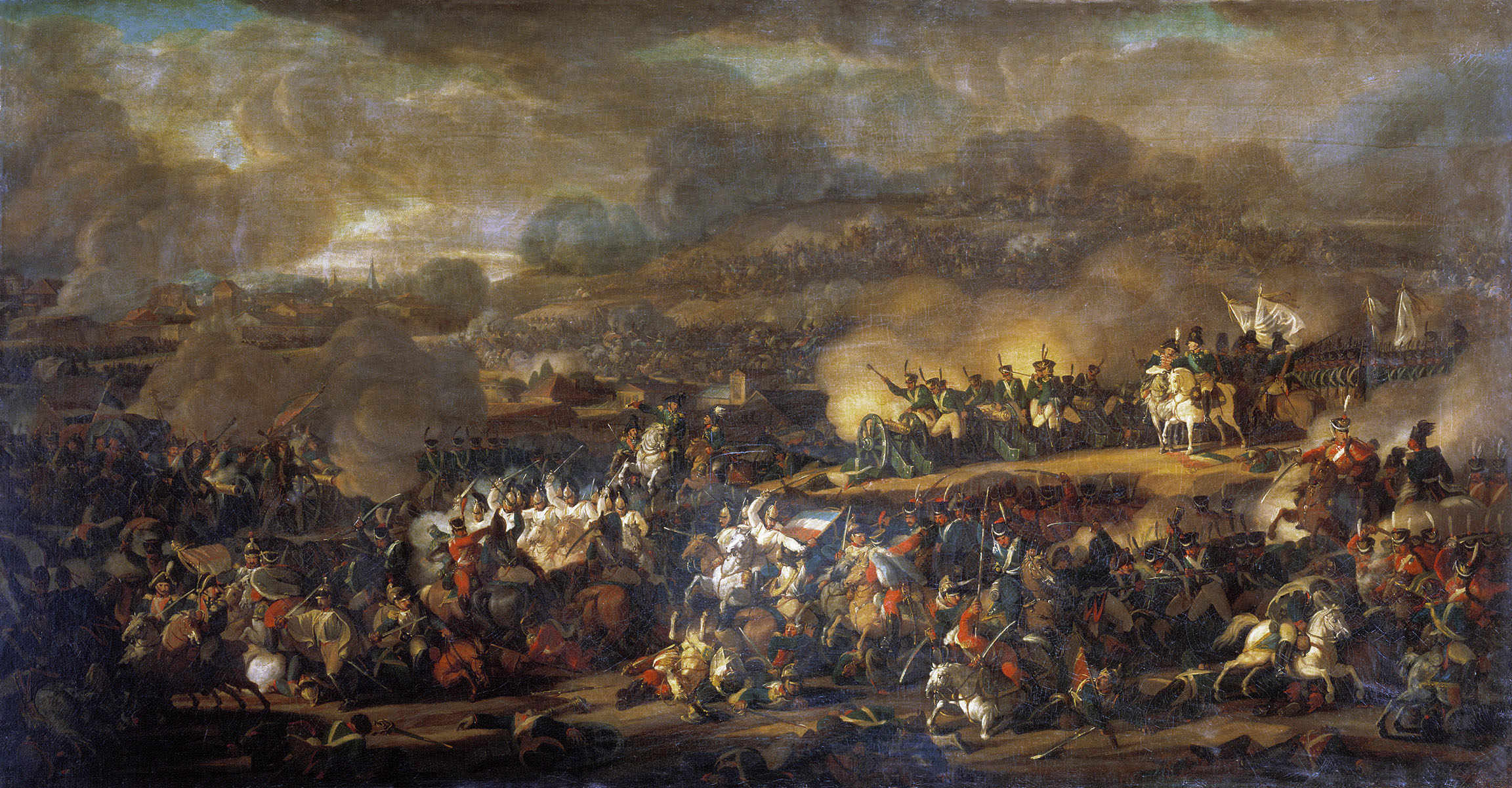
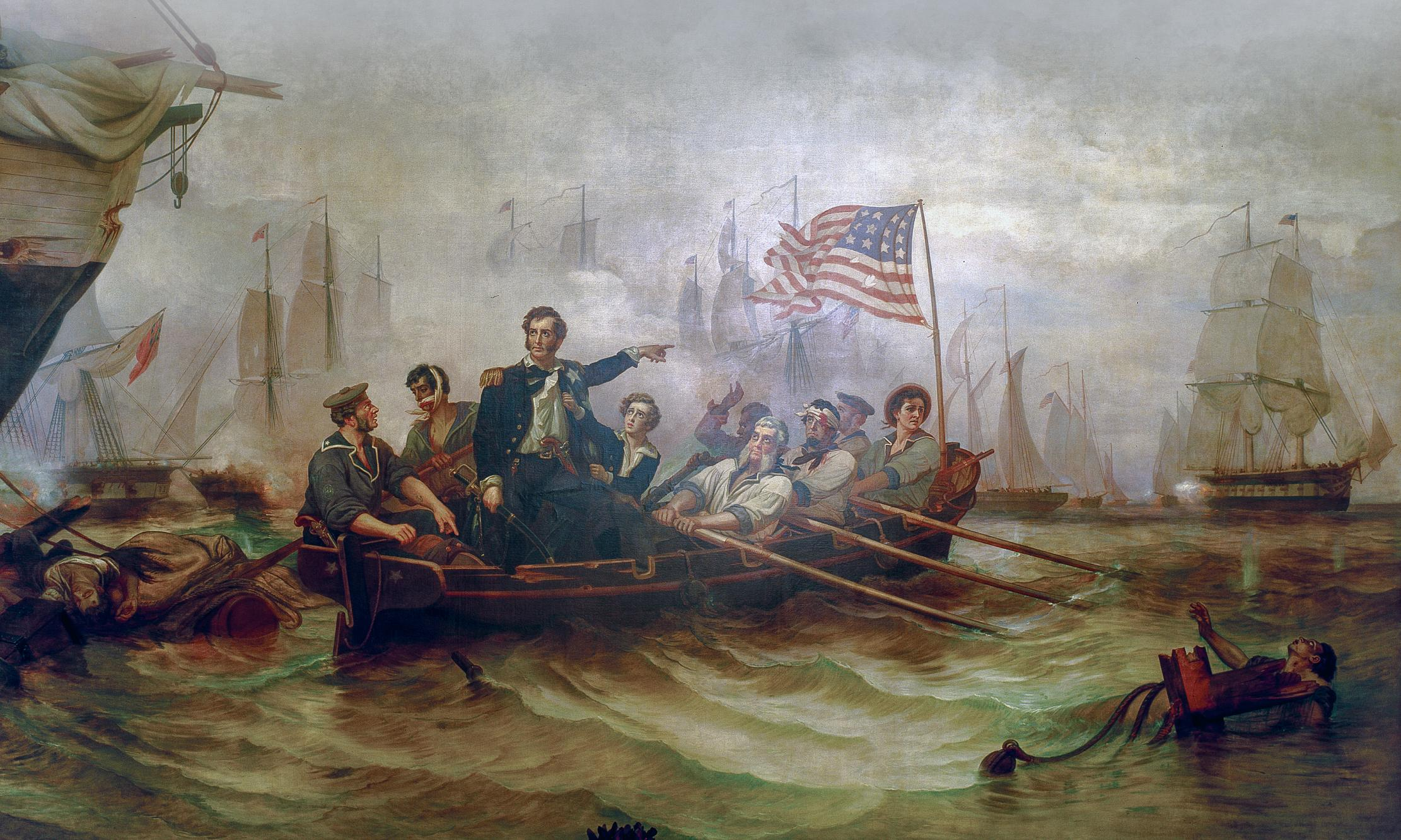
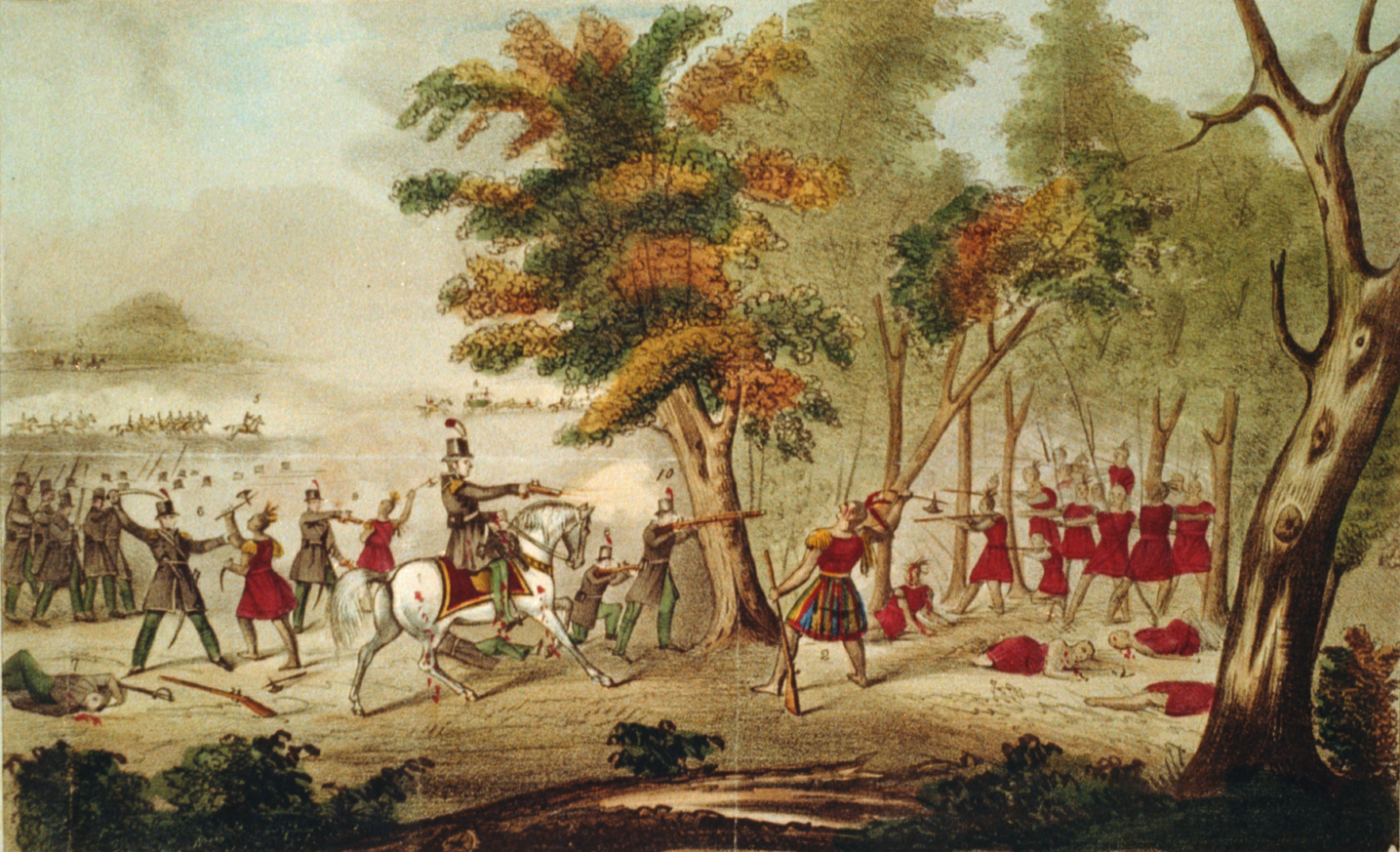
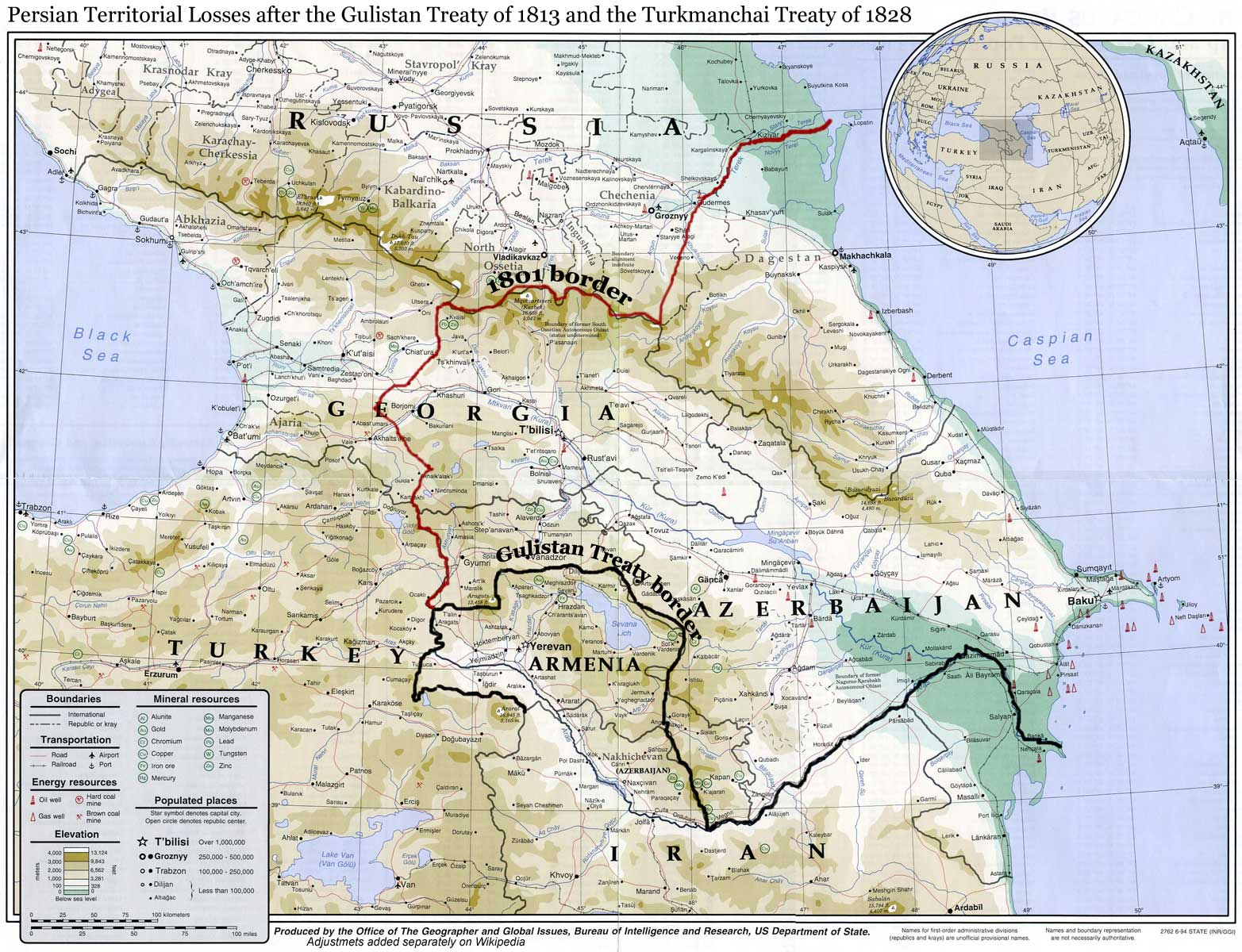
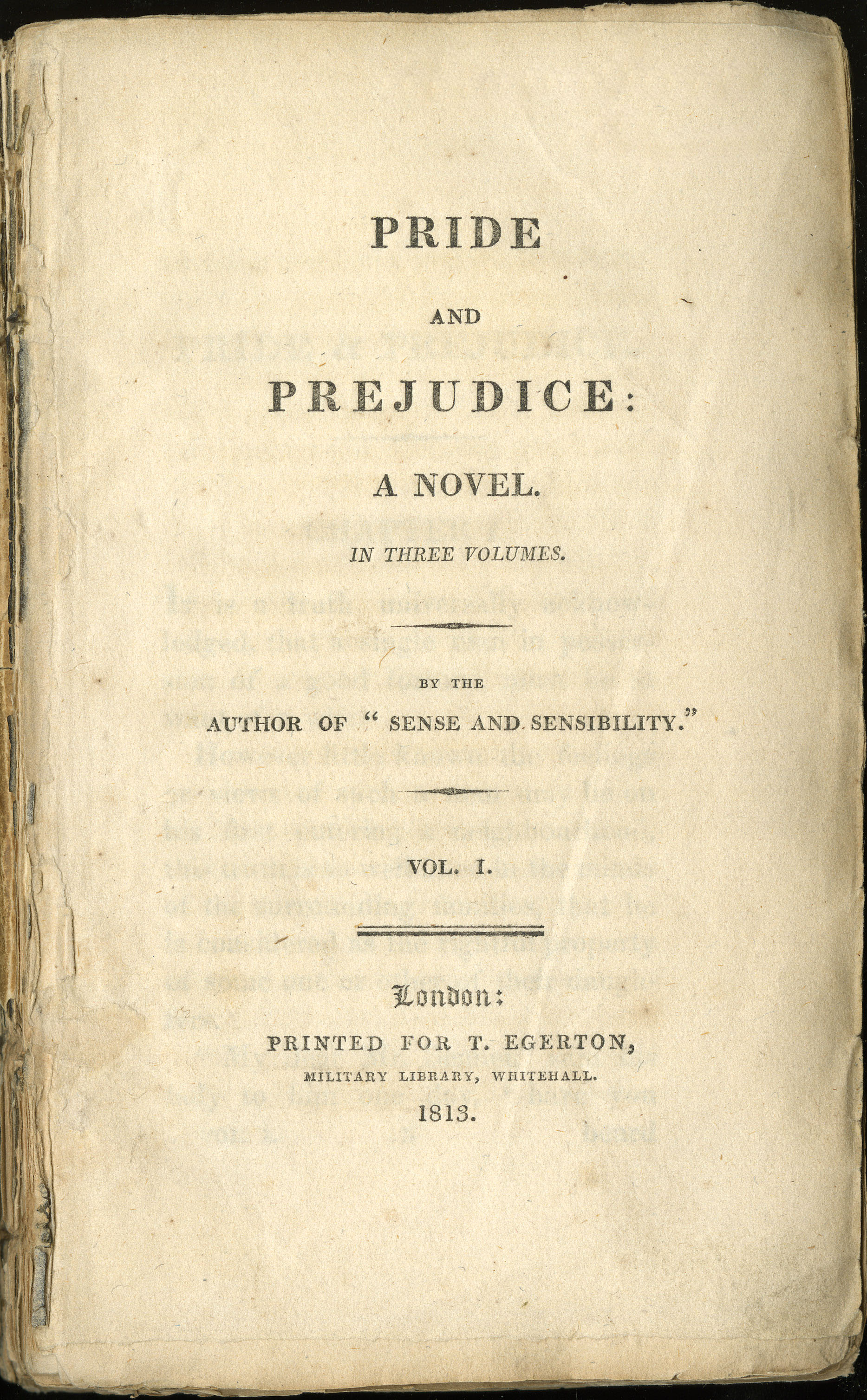
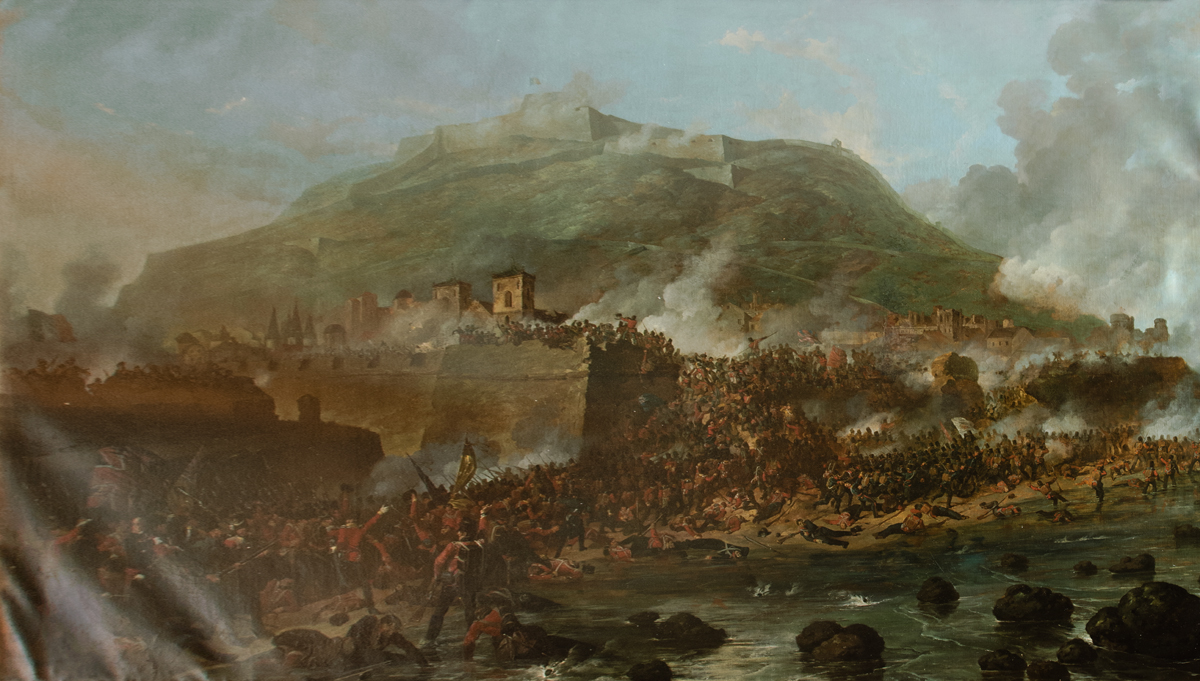
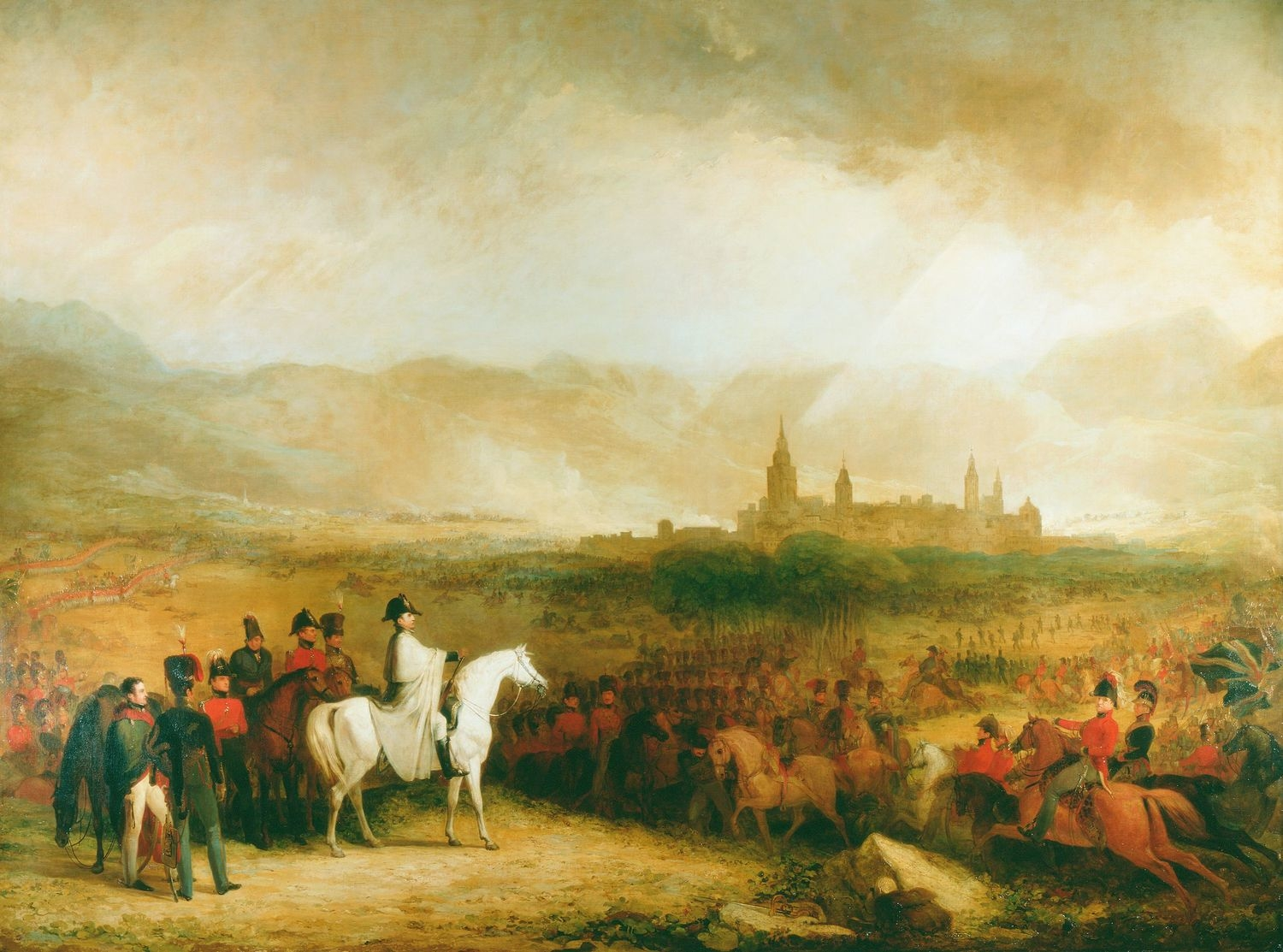
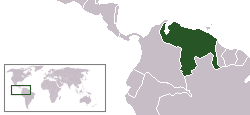
Clockwise from top left: The Battle of Leipzig was one of the largest battles of the Napoleonic Wars; An American squadron under Oliver Hazard Perry wins the Battle of Lake Erie, gaining control over Lake Erie; American forces under William Henry Harrison defeat the British and their Native American allies at the Battle of the Thames; A peace treaty between the Russian Empire and Persia (now Iran) leads to the end of the Russo-Persian War; Jane Austen publishes one of the most famous novels in English literature, Pride and Prejudice; British and Portuguese forces capture San Sebastián from the French; The Battle of Vitoria was a major battle where British, Portuguese, and Spanish forces under the Duke of Wellington defeated the French, leading to the collapse of French rule in Spain; Simón Bolívar enters Caracas after a series of victories in the Venezuelan War of Independence, leading to the temporary establishment of the Second Republic of Venezuela.

== Events ==
=== January–March ===
- January 5 – The Danish state bankruptcy of 1813 occurs.
- January 18–23 – War of 1812: The Battle of Frenchtown is fought in modern-day Monroe, Michigan between the United States and a British and Native American alliance.
- January 24 – The Philharmonic Society (later the Royal Philharmonic Society) is founded in London.
- January 28 – Jane Austen's Pride and Prejudice is published anonymously in London.
- January 31 – The Assembly of the Year XIII is inaugurated in Buenos Aires.
- February – War of 1812 in North America: General William Henry Harrison sends out an expedition to burn the British vessels at Fort Malden by going across Lake Erie via the Bass Islands in sleighs, but the ice is not hard enough, and the expedition returns.
- February 3 – Argentine War of Independence: José de San Martín and his Regiment of Mounted Grenadiers gain a largely symbolic victory against a Spanish royalist army in the Battle of San Lorenzo.
- February 7 – Napoleonic Wars: Action of 7 February 1813 – The French frigate Aréthuse and the British ship HMS Amelia engage in battle in the Îles de Los on the Guinea Coast; both ships retire unbeaten.
- February 9 – Prussia abolishes the canton system.
- February 11 – War of 1812: Construction begins on Fort Meigs in Ohio, under the command of General William Henry Harrison. Major Amos Stoddard assumes command of its artillery.
- March 4
  - Napoleonic Wars: The French garrison evacuates Berlin, leaving Russian troops able to reach and take the city without a fight.
  - Cyril VI of Constantinople is elected Ecumenical Patriarch.
- March 17 – Napoleonic Wars: Prussia declares war on France, and introduces the Iron Cross military award (backdated to March 10).
- March 28 – 1813–1814 Malta plague epidemic spreads from Egypt.
- March 29 – Mexican War of Independence: Battle of Rosillo Creek – The Republican Army of the North defeats the Spanish Royalist Army in modern-day Bexar County, Texas.

=== April–June ===
- April 8 – War of 1812: Colonel James Ball arrives at Fort Meigs with 200 dragoons.
- April 27 – War of 1812: Battle of York – United States troops raid and destroy but do not hold the capital of Upper Canada, York (modern-day Toronto).
- May 1–9 – War of 1812: Fort Meigs is first besieged, by British allied forces under General Henry Proctor and Chief Tecumseh.
- May 2 – Napoleonic Wars: Battle of Lützen – Napoleon wins against the German alliance.
- May 11 – 1813 crossing of the Blue Mountains: Gregory Blaxland, William Lawson and William Wentworth leave on an expedition to cross the Blue Mountains of Australia.
- May 20–21 – Napoleonic Wars: Battle of Bautzen – Napoleon again defeats his combined enemies.
- May 27 – War of 1812: In Canada, American forces capture Fort George.
- June 1 – War of 1812: Capture of USS Chesapeake in Boston Harbor by British Royal Navy frigate HMS Shannon.
- June 6
  - War of 1812: Battle of Stoney Creek – A British force of 700 under John Vincent defeats an American force three times its size, under William H. Winder and John Chandler.
  - 1813 crossing of the Blue Mountains: Gregory Blaxland, William Lawson and William Wentworth succeed in crossing the Blue Mountains (New South Wales) and return home.
- June 21 – Peninsular War: Battle of Vitoria – A British, Spanish and Portuguese force of 78,000 with 96 guns under Wellington defeats a French force of 58,000 with 153 guns under Joseph Bonaparte.

=== July–September ===
- July – War of 1812 – The second siege of Fort Meigs by British allied forces fails.
- July 5 – War of 1812: Three weeks of British raids on Fort Schlosser, Black Rock and Plattsburgh, New York begin.
- July 13
  - The Carabinieri, the national military police of Italy, are founded by Victor Emmanuel I as the police force of the Kingdom of Sardinia.
  - Missionaries Adoniram Judson and his wife, Ann Hasseltine Judson, arrive in Burma.
- July 21 – U.K. Parliament passes the Doctrine of the Trinity Act 1813, repealing legal penalties for non-trinitarian sects such as Unitarians, and codifying religious tolerance in Great Britain (the Toleration Act of 1688 did not apply to Jews, non-trinitarians, or Roman Catholics).
- July 23 – Sir Thomas Maitland is appointed as the first Governor of Malta, transforming the island from a British protectorate to a de facto colony.
- August 12 – Napoleonic Wars: Austria declares war on France.
- August 19 – Gervasio Antonio de Posadas joins Argentina's second triumvirate.
- August 23 – Napoleonic Wars – Battle of Großbeeren: Napoleon is defeated by Prussia and Sweden.
- August 26 – Napoleonic Wars – Battle of Katzbach: Napoleon's troops are defeated by Prussia and Russia.
- August 26–27 – Napoleonic Wars – Battle of Dresden: Napoleon's troops are victorious.
- August 29–30 – Napoleonic Wars – First Battle of Kulm: French Marshal Vandamme is defeated and captured, by allied Coalition forces from Russia, Prussia and Austria.
- August 30 – Creek War – Fort Mims massacre: A force of Creeks, belonging to the Red Sticks faction, kills hundreds of settlers in Fort Mims, Alabama.
- August 31 – Peninsular War:
  - Battle of San Marcial: The Spanish Army of Galicia under Manuel Freire de Andrade turns back Marshal Soult's last major offensive against Wellington's allied army.
  - After besieging San Sebastián, allied troops in Spain rampage, ransack and burn down the town almost entirely.
- September – Robert Southey becomes Poet Laureate of the United Kingdom.
- September 4 – The name of Germany's national card game, "Scat" (modern-day Skat), appears for the first time, in the gaming records of Hans Carl Leopold von der Gabelentz.
- September 6 – Napoleonic Wars – Battle of Dennewitz: The armies of Napoleon I are again defeated by Prussia and Russia.
- September 10 – War of 1812 – Battle of Lake Erie: An American squadron under Commodore Oliver Hazard Perry defeats a British squadron, capturing 6 ships.
- September 17 – Napoleonic Wars – Second Battle of Kulm: The Allied Coalition is victorious; Napoleon I is forced to halt his advance on Teplitz, and withdraw to Leipzig.

=== October–December ===
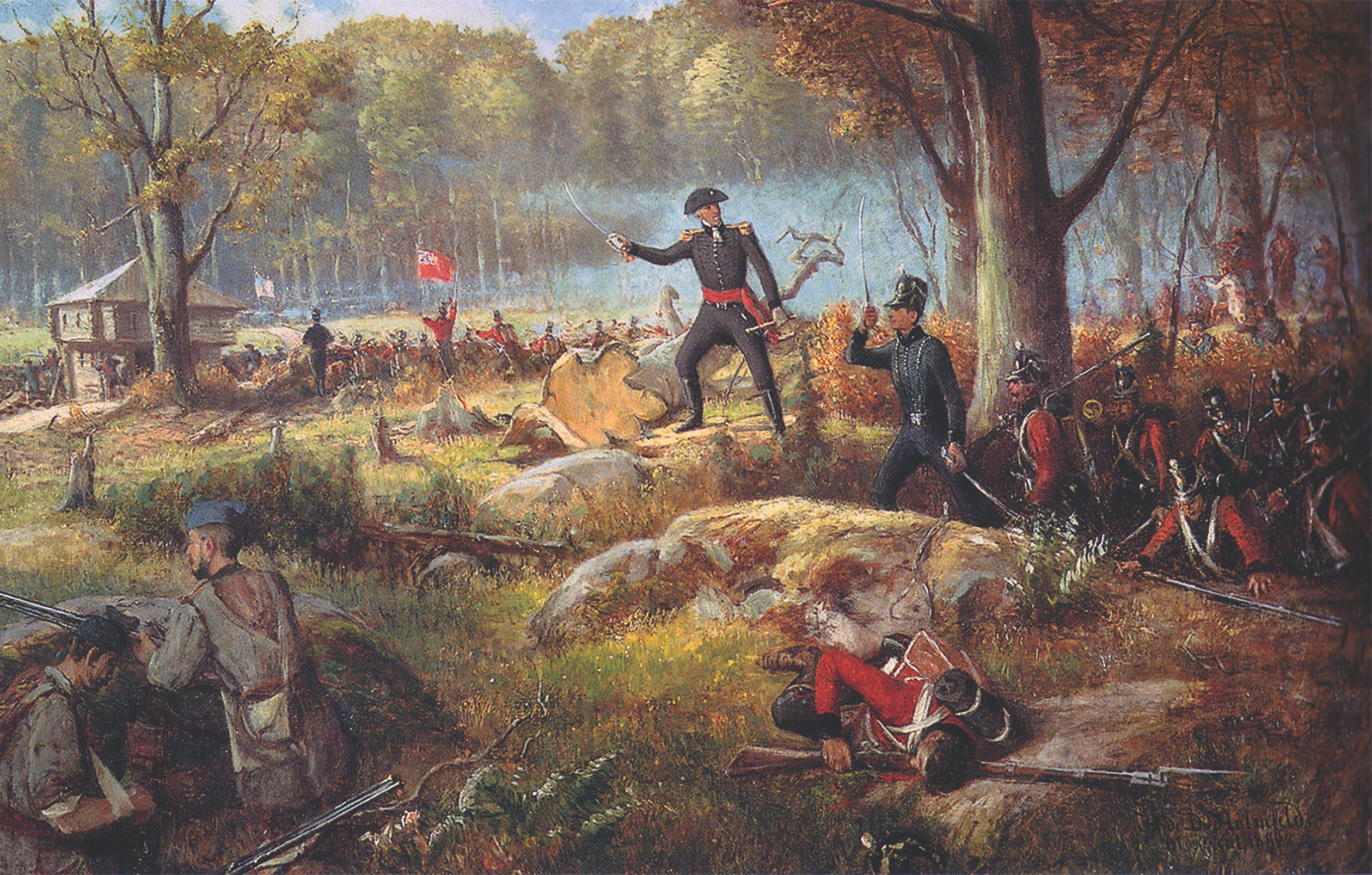
October 26: Battle of the Chateauguay

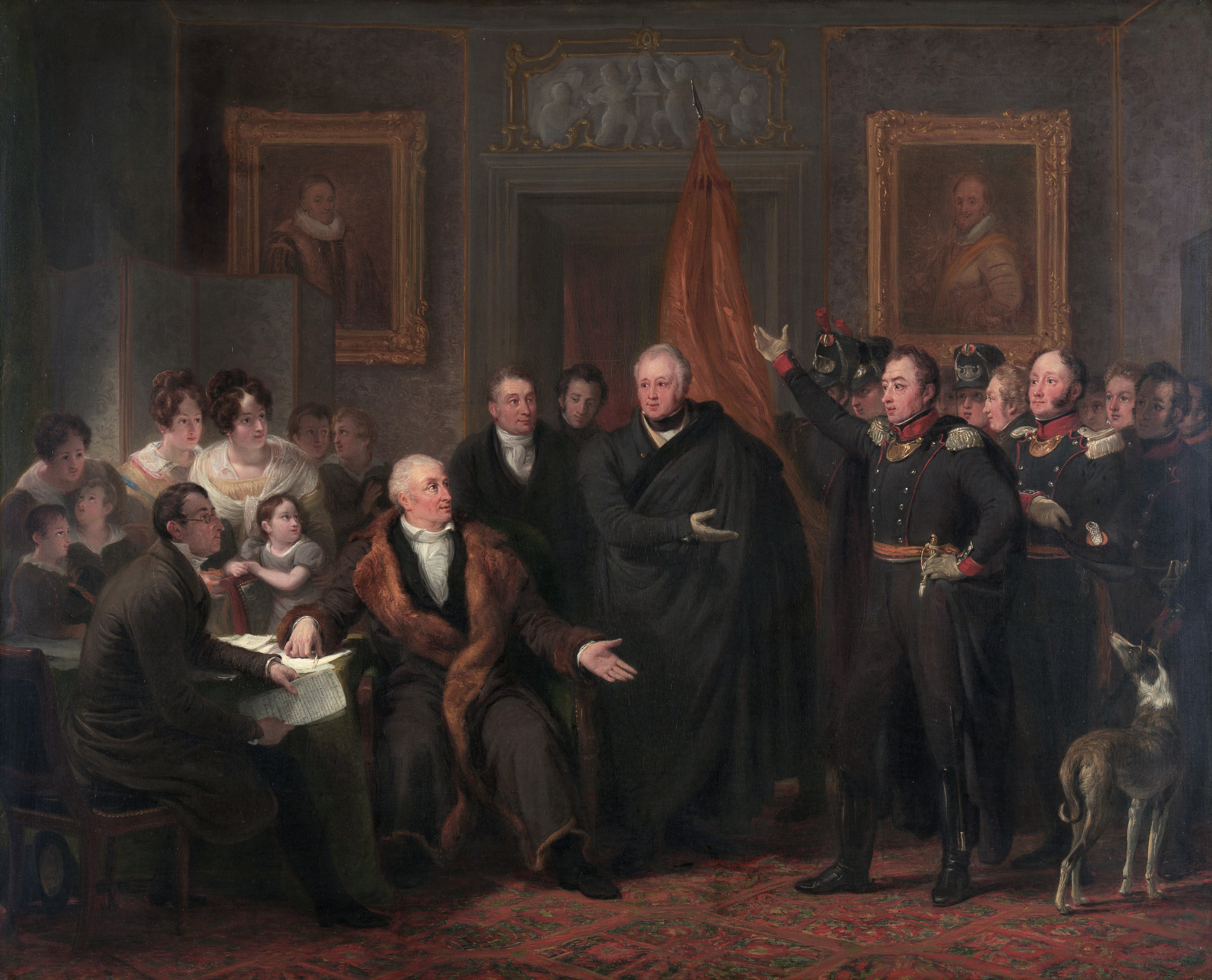
November 20: Dutch rise up against French rule.

- October 2 – The Philomathean Society of the University of Pennsylvania is founded (the oldest continuously existing literary society in the United States).
- October 5 – War of 1812 – Battle of the Thames in Upper Canada: William Henry Harrison defeats the British, and native leader Tecumseh is killed in battle.
- October 14 – After a ceremony in Caracas, Venezuela, the municipality gives Simón Bolívar the title of El Libertador.
- October 16–19 – Napoleonic Wars – Battle of Leipzig: Napoleon is defeated by the forces of the Sixth Coalition. More than 600,000 troops are in the field, with well over 10% killed, wounded or missing. Many of the German states forming the Confederation of the Rhine defect from Napoleon I to the Coalition, as a result of the battle.
- October 24–November 5 – Persia and Russia sign the Treaty of Gulistan at the end of the Russo-Persian War, by which Persia loses modern-day Georgia, Dagestan and most of Azerbaijan to Russia.
- October 26 – War of 1812 – Battle of the Chateauguay: Charles de Salaberry defeats an American invasion.
- October 30–31 – Battle of Hanau: French forces under Napoleon I defeat the Austrian army (43,000 men) at Hanau. Napoleon fights his way back while retreating to France.
- November 11 – War of 1812 – Battle of Crysler's Farm: An outnumbered British–Canadian force defeats the Americans, forcing them to give up their attempt to capture Montreal.
- November 21 – An independent government is restored in the Netherlands.
- December 8 – Ludwig van Beethoven's Symphony No. 7, together with his Wellington's Victory, are premiered in Vienna under the composer's baton, in a benefit concert for Austrian and Bavarian soldiers wounded at the Battle of Hanau.
- December 18–19 – War of 1812: British soldiers and native allies invade the United States, and are successful in the Capture of Fort Niagara, and attack Lewiston, New York.
- December 29 – War of 1812: British soldiers burn Buffalo, New York.

=== Date unknown ===
- Mathieu Orfila publishes his groundbreaking Traité des poisons, formalizing the field of toxicology.
- Charles Waterton begins the process of turning his estate at Walton Hall, West Yorkshire, England into what is, in effect, the world's first nature reserve.
- Following the death of his father Wossen Seged, Sahle Selassie arrives at the capital Qundi before his other brothers, and is made Meridazmach of Shewa.
- The Supreme Council for the Northern Jurisdiction of the United States of America is founded.
- Probable date – George E. Clymer invents the Columbian press, used to print newspapers worldwide.

== Births ==
=== January–June ===
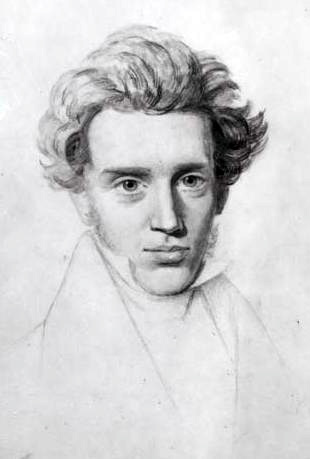
Søren Kierkegaard

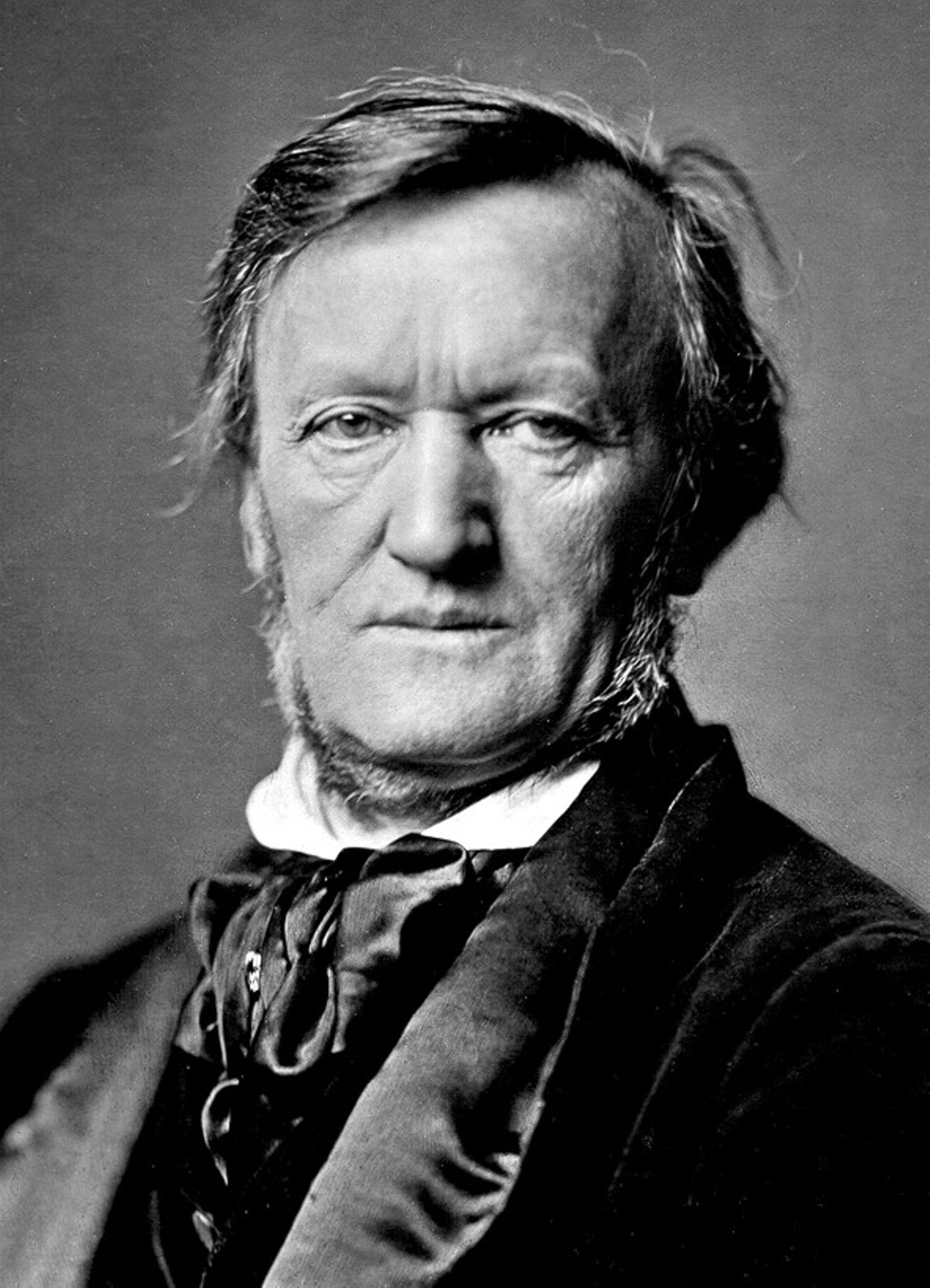
Richard Wagner

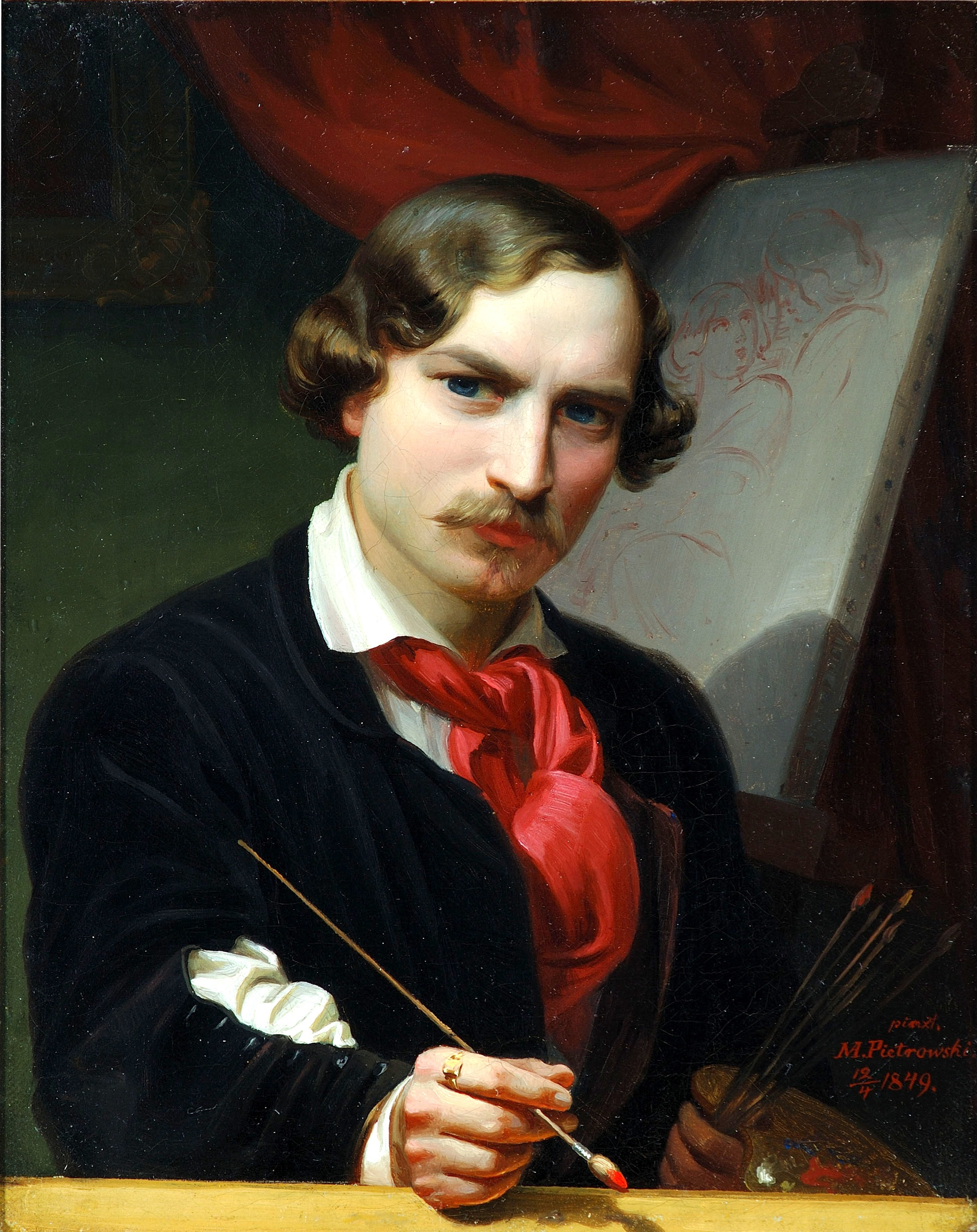
Maximilian Piotrowski

- January 19 – Sir Henry Bessemer, English inventor (d. 1898)
- January 21 – John C. Frémont, American soldier, explorer (d. 1890)
- January 26 – Juan Pablo Duarte, founder of the Dominican Republic (d. 1876)
- February 8 – José Manuel Pareja, Spanish admiral (d. 1865)
- February 11 – Otto Ludwig, German writer (d. 1865)
- February 12 – James Dwight Dana, American geologist, mineralogist (d. 1895)
- February 15 – Frederick Holbrook, Vermont governor (d. 1909)
- March 14 – Joseph P. Bradley, Associate Justice of the Supreme Court of the United States (d. 1892)
- March 15 – John Snow, English doctor, pioneer of epidemiology (d. 1858)
- March 16 – Gaëtan de Rochebouët, Prime Minister of France (d. 1899)
- March 18 – Christian Friedrich Hebbel, German poet, playwright (d. 1863)
- March 19 – David Livingstone, Scottish missionary explorer (d. 1873)
- March 21 – James Strang, Mormon splinter group leader (d. 1856)
- March 23 – Mary Elizabeth Lee, American writer (d. 1849)
- March 27 – Nathaniel Currier, American illustrator (d. 1888)
- April 1 – Karl Friedrich August Rammelsberg, German mineralogist (d. 1899)
- April 8 – Leah Fox, American hoax medium (d. 1890)
- April 17 – Mary Peters, née Bowley, English hymn writer (d. 1856)
- April 19 – David Settle Reid, American politician (d. 1891)
- April 23 – Stephen A. Douglas, American Senator from Illinois, presidential candidate (d. 1861)
- May 5 – Søren Kierkegaard, Danish philosopher (d. 1855)
- May 15 – Stephen Heller, Hungarian composer (d. 1888)
- May 21 – Robert Murray M'Cheyne, Scottish clergyman (d. 1843)
- May 22 – Richard Wagner, German composer (d. 1883)
- June 2 – Daniel Pollen, 9th Prime Minister of New Zealand (d. 1896)
- June 8 – David Dixon Porter, American admiral (d. 1891)
- June 8 – Maximilian Piotrowski, Polish painter, Kunstakademie Königsberg professor (d. 1875)
- June 24 – Henry Ward Beecher, American clergyman, reformer (d. 1887)

=== July–December ===
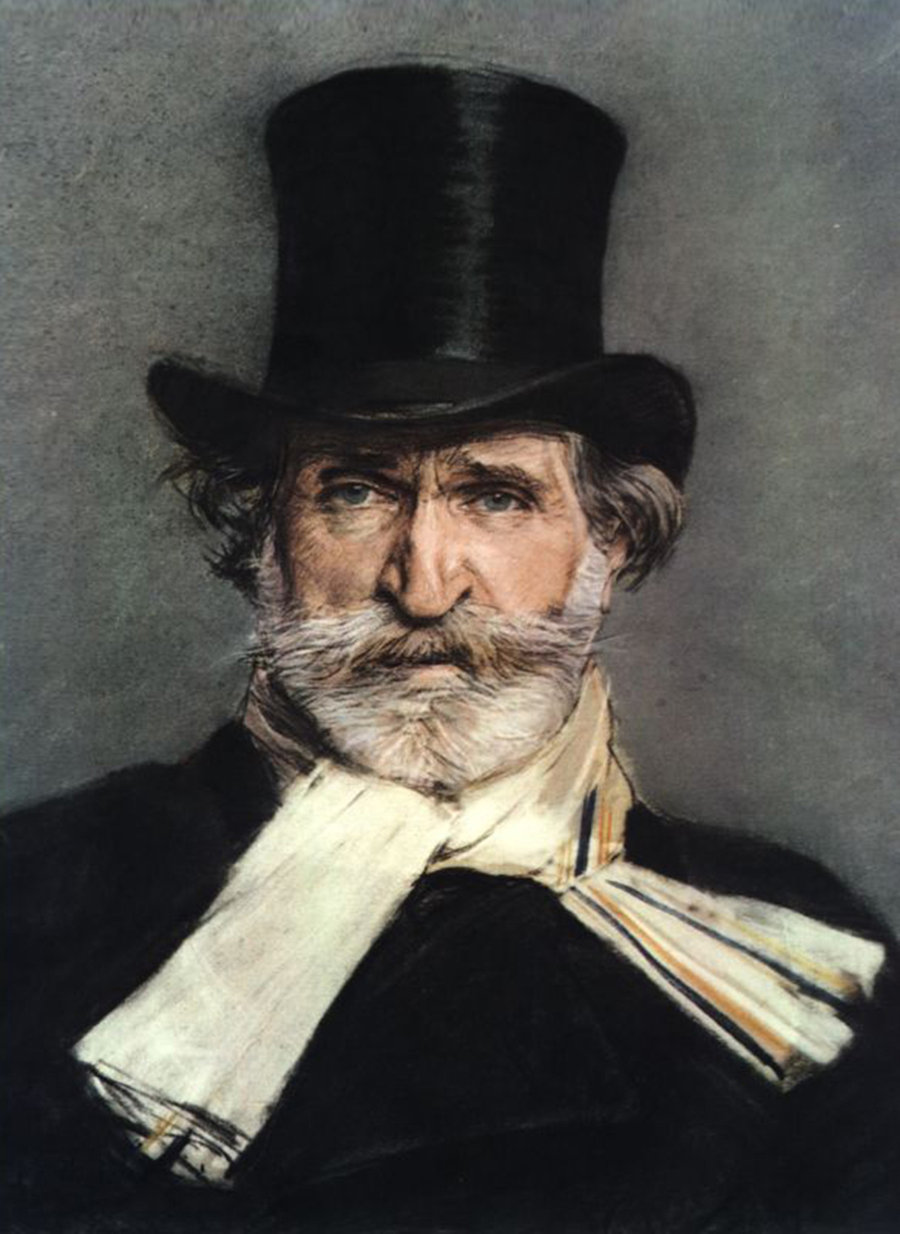
Giuseppe Verdi

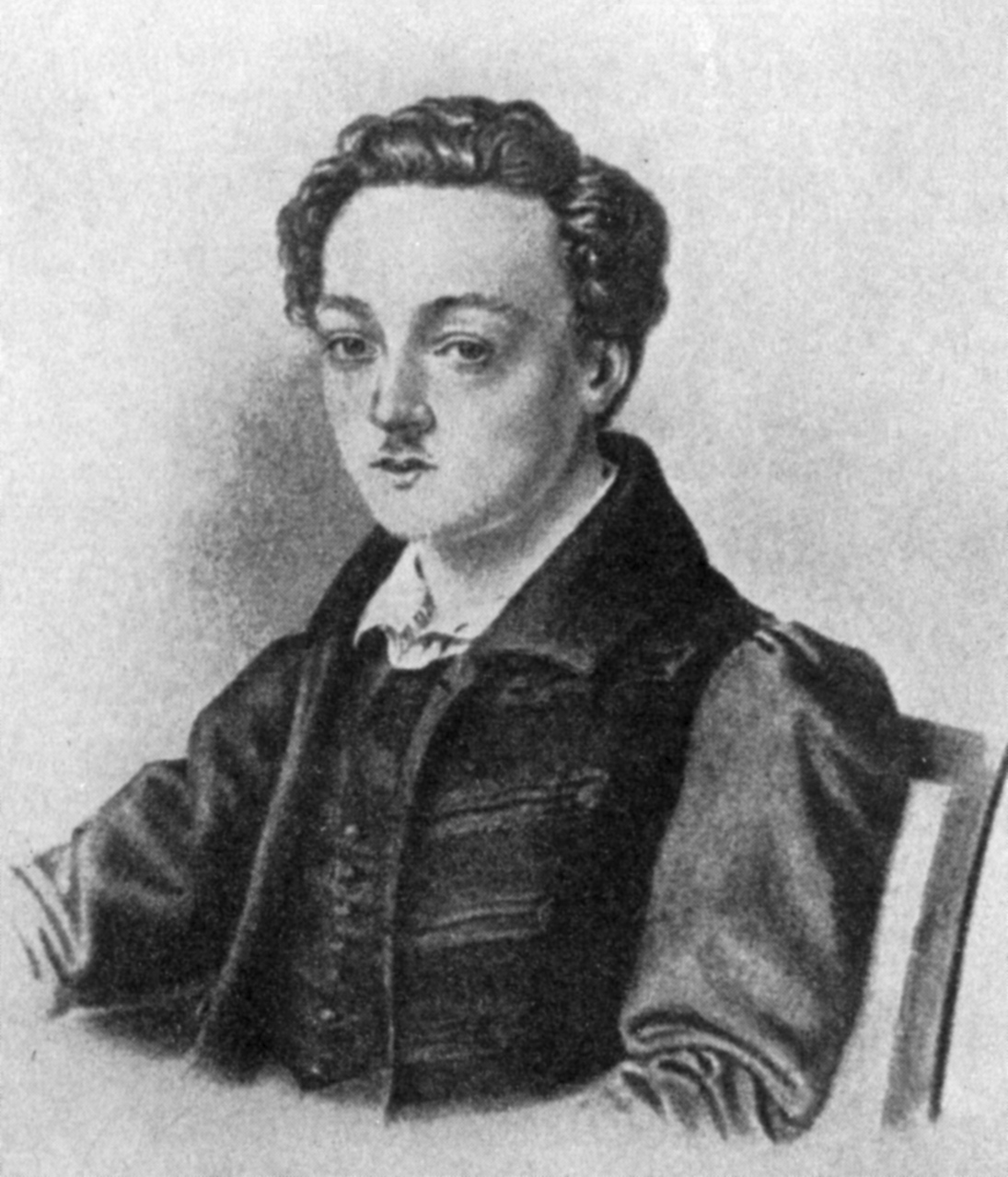
Georg Büchner

- July 15 – George Peter Alexander Healy, American portrait painter (d. 1894)
- July 19 – Samuel M. Kier, American industrialist (d. 1874)
- August 5 – Ivar Aasen, Norwegian philologist (d. 1896)
- August 21 – Jean Stas, Belgian chemist (d. 1891)
- August 29 – Henry Bergh, American founder of the American Society for the Prevention of Cruelty to Animals (d. 1888)
- September 13 – John Erskine, Irish-American jurist and United States district judge from 1865 to 1883 (d. 1895)
- September 17 – John Sedgwick, Union Army General, American Civil War (d. 1864)
- September 24 – Gerardo Barrios, President of El Salvador (d. 1865)
- October 10 – Giuseppe Verdi, Italian composer (d. 1901)
- October 17 – Georg Büchner, German playwright (d. 1837)
- November 13
  - Kreeta Haapasalo, Finnish kantele-player, singer and folk musician (d. 1893)
  - Allen G. Thurman, American politician (d. 1895)
- November 19 – Augusta Schrumpf, Norwegian actor (d. 1900)
- November 25 – Marie Jules Dupré, French admiral and colonial governor (d. 1881)
- November 30 – Charles-Valentin Alkan, French composer (d. 1888)
- December 19 – Thomas Andrews, Irish chemist (d.1885)
- December 29 – Alexander Parkes, English metallurgist and inventor (d. 1890)

=== Date unknown ===
- Juan Diéguez Olaverri, Guatemalan writer (d. 1866)
- John Miley, American Methodist theologian (d. 1895)
- John Thomas, English Victorian sculptor (d. 1862)
- José María Díaz, Spanish romanticist playwright and journalist (d. 1888)

== Deaths ==
=== January–June ===
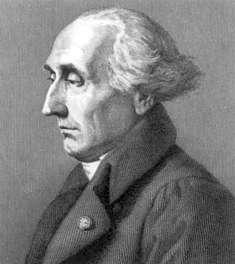
Joseph-Louis Lagrange

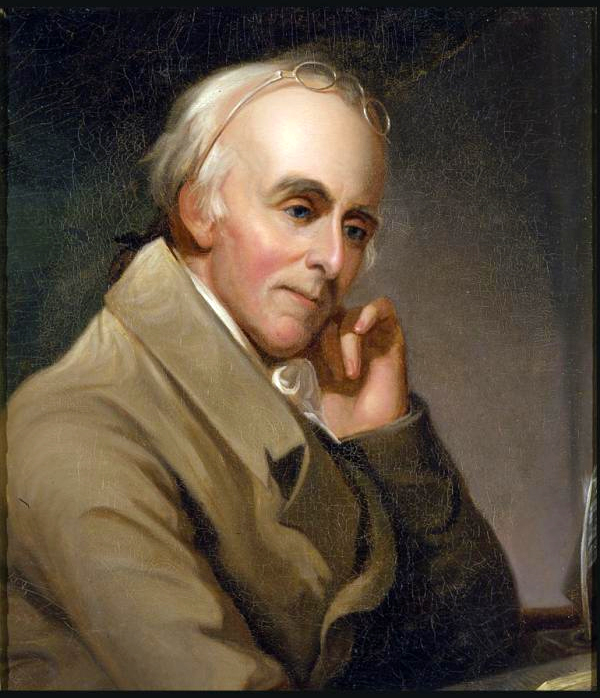
Benjamin Rush

- January 1 – Gioacchino Navarro, Maltese priest and poet (b. 1748)
- January 6 – Louis Baraguey d'Hilliers, French general (b. 1764)
- January 15 – Anton Bernolák, Slovak linguist (b. 1762)
- January 20 – Christoph Martin Wieland, German writer (b. 1733)
- January 24 – George Clymer, American signer of the Declaration of Independence (b. 1739)
- February 13 – Samuel Ashe, Governor of North Carolina (b. 1725)
- February 26 – Robert Livingston, American signer of the Declaration of Independence (b. 1746)
- March 23 – Princess Augusta of Great Britain, elder sibling of King George III (b. 1737)
- April 3 – Friederike Brion, first great love of Johann Wolfgang Goethe (b. 1752)
- April 10 – Joseph-Louis Lagrange, Italian mathematician (b. 1736)
- April 19 – Benjamin Rush, Founding Father of the United States (b. 1746)
- April 27 – Zebulon Pike, American general (b. 1779)
- April 28 – Mikhail Kutuzov, Russian field marshal (b. 1745)
- April 29 – John Andrews, American clergyman, Provost of the University of Pennsylvania, considered America's first scholar (b. 1746)
- May 1 – Jean-Baptiste Bessières, French marshal (killed in action) (b. 1768)
- May 21 – José Antonio Pareja, Spanish admiral (b. 1757)
- May 23 – Géraud Duroc, French general (mortally wounded in action) (b. 1772)
- June 6
  - Alexandre-Théodore Brongniart, French architect (b. 1739)
  - Antonio Cachia, Maltese architect, engineer and archaeologist (b. 1739)
- June 17 – Charles Middleton, 1st Baron Barham, English sailor, politician (b. 1726)
- July 6 – Granville Sharp, English abolitionist (b. 1735)
- July 17 – Fredrica Löf, Swedish actress (b. 1760)
- June 28 – Gerhard von Scharnhorst, Prussian general (b. 1755)

=== July–December ===
Tecumseh

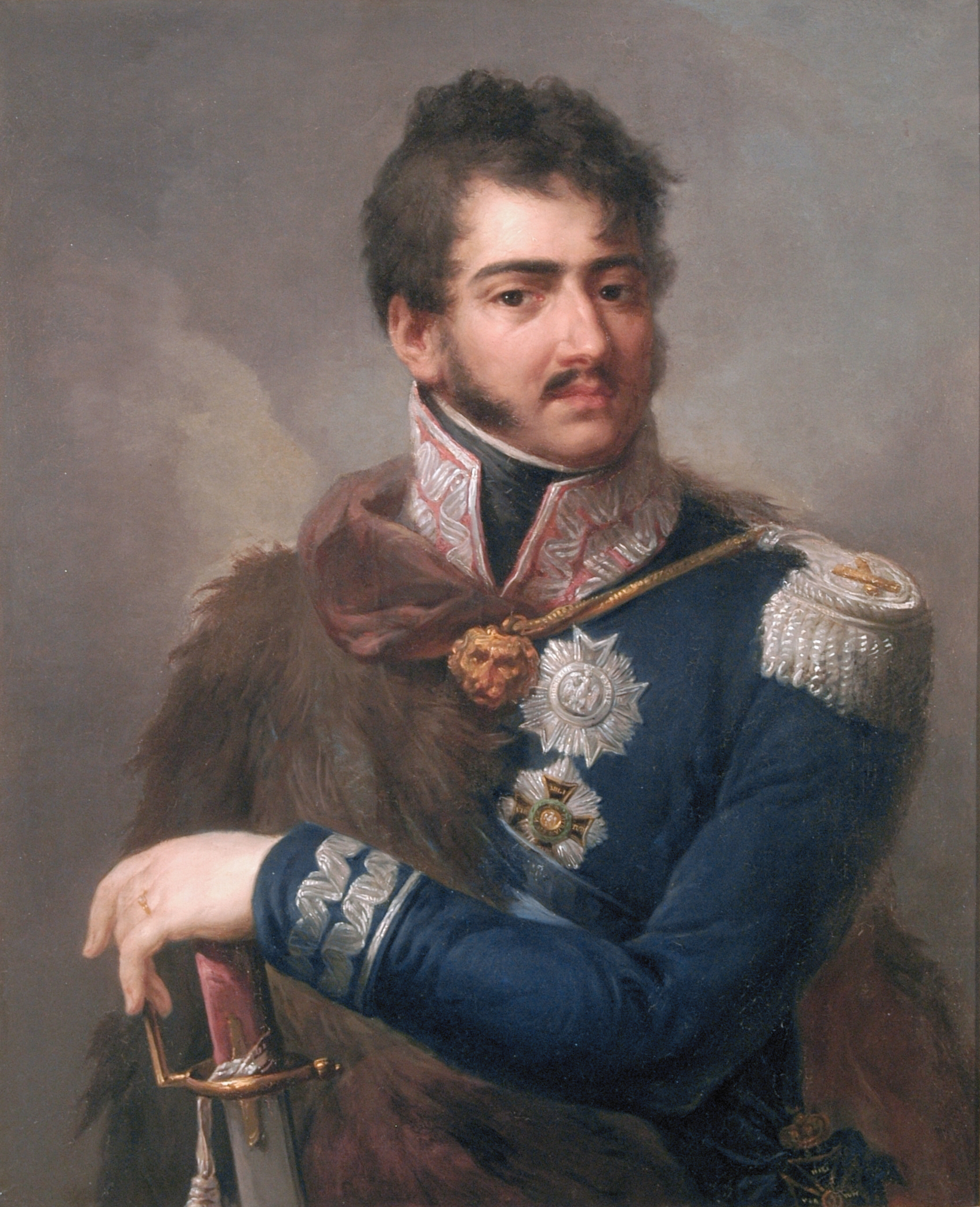
Józef Poniatowski

- July 29 – Jean-Andoche Junot, French general (suicide) (b. 1771)
- August 1 – Carl Stenborg, Swedish opera singer (b. 1752)
- August 11 – Henry James Pye, English poet (b. 1745)
- August 15 – Abigail Amelia, First born daughter of John and Abigail Adams (b. 1765)
- August 21 – Sophia Magdalena of Denmark, Queen consort of Sweden (born 1746)
- August 23 – Alexander Wilson, Scottish-born ornithologist (b. 1766)
- August 26 – Theodor Körner, German author, soldier (b. 1791)
- September 2 – Jean Victor Marie Moreau, French general (mortally wounded in battle) (b. 1763)
- September 12 – Edmund Randolph, American politician (b. 1753)
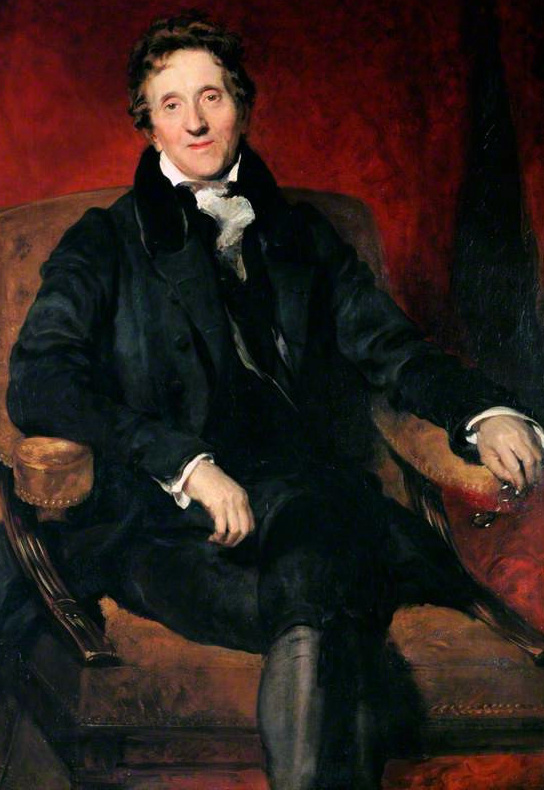
  John Soane
- September 13 – Hezqeyas, deposed Emperor of Ethiopia
- September 15 – Antoine Étienne de Tousard, French general, military engineer (b. 1752)
- September 22 – Rose Bertin, French fashion designer (b. 1747)
- October 5 – Tecumseh, Native American (Shawnee) leader (b. 1768)
- October 19 – Józef Poniatowski, Polish prince, Marshal of France (friendly fire) (b. 1763)
- November 10 – Francis Fane of Spettisbury, Member of the British Parliament (b. 1752)
- November 12 – Jean de Crèvecœur, French-American writer (b. 1735)
- November 30 – Giambattista Bodoni, Italian publisher and engraver (b. 1740)
- November – William Franklin, son of Benjamin Franklin (b. c. 1730) (Note: Documents published by the New Jersey State Department give 13 November, Encyclopedia.com gives 16 November.)
- December 24 – Empress Go-Sakuramachi of Japan (b. 1740)
- December 27 – Gustaf Adolf Reuterholm, Swedish statesman (b. 1756)

=== Date unknown ===
- Josefa Joaquina Sánchez, Venezuelan embroiderer and independence heroine (b. 1765)
- Nikolaos Koutouzis – Greek painter, poet and priest (b. 1741)
