= 1813 in the United Kingdom =

Events from the year 1813 in the United Kingdom.

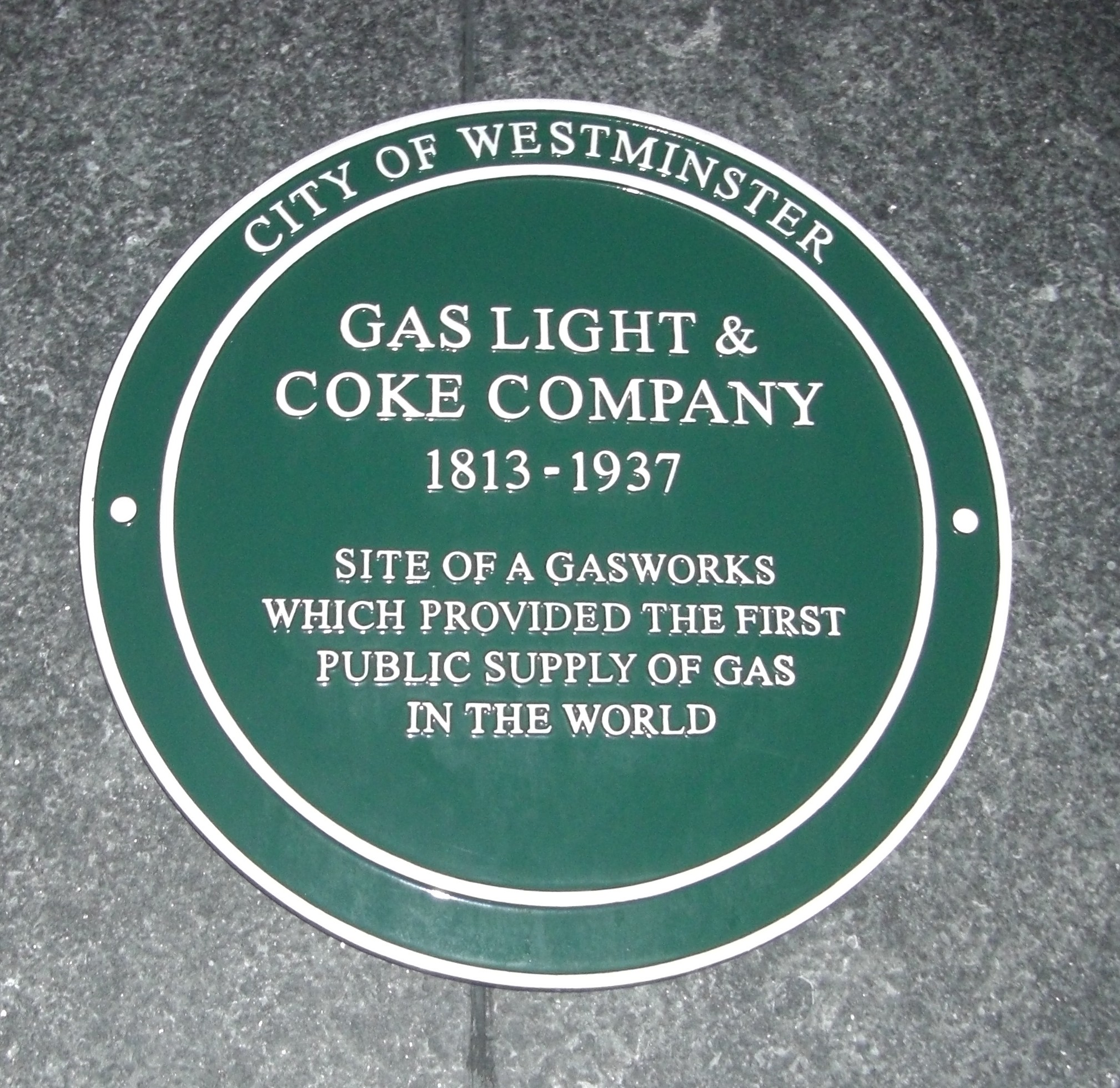
Commemorative plaque in Great Peter Street

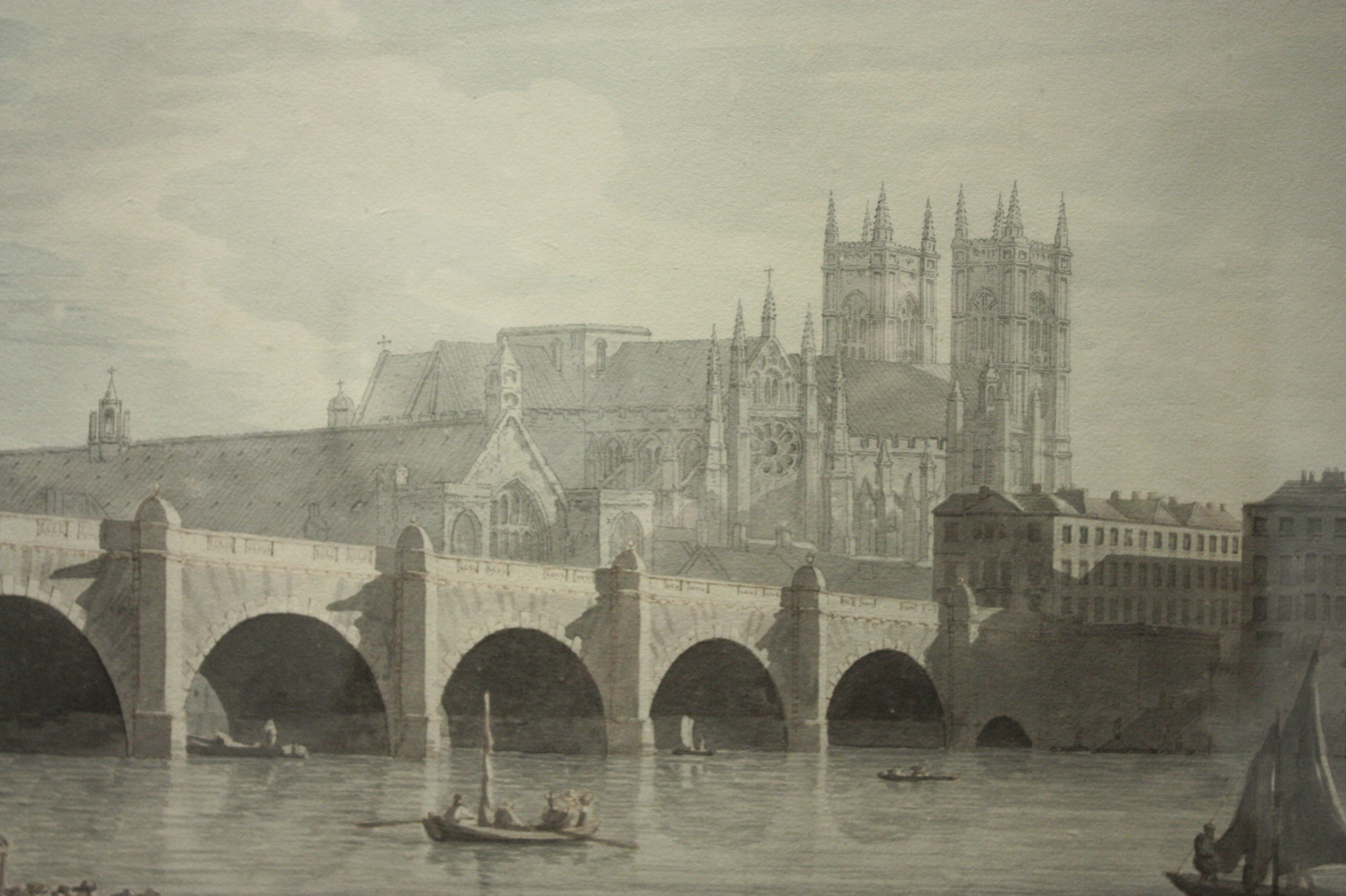
Westminster Bridge (drawn by Joseph Farrington, 1789) was among the first places in the world to be lit by gas, in 1813.

== Incumbents ==
- Monarch – George III
- Regent – George, Prince Regent
- Prime Minister – Robert Jenkinson, 2nd Earl of Liverpool (Tory)
- Foreign Secretary – Robert Stewart, Viscount Castlereagh
- Home Secretary – Lord Sidmouth
- Secretary of War – Lord Bathurst

== Events ==
- 16 January – 14 Luddites hanged at York.
- 24 January – The Philharmonic Society of London is formed, holding its first concert on 8 March.
- 1 June – War of 1812: Capture of USS Chesapeake in Boston Harbor by British Royal Navy frigate HMS Shannon (1806).
- 6 June – War of 1812: Battle of Stoney Creek – a British force of 700 under John Vincent defeat an American force three times its size under William Winder and John Chandler.
- 21 June – Peninsular War: Battle of Vitoria – a British, Spanish, and Portuguese force of 78,000 with 96 guns under Wellington defeats a French force of 58,000 with 153 guns under Joseph Bonaparte to end the Peninsular War.
- 1 July – Indian trade monopoly of the British East India Company abolished.
- 5 July – War of 1812: three weeks of British raids on Fort Schlosser, Black Rock and Plattsburgh, New York begin.
- The Vittoria Fête is held at Vauxhall Gardens in London to celebrate the victory at the Battle of Vitoria by Lord Wellington in the Peninsular War
- 21 July – Doctrine of the Trinity Act provides toleration for Unitarian worship.
- September – Robert Southey becomes Poet Laureate.
- 10 September – War of 1812: Oliver Hazard Perry defeats a British fleet in the Battle of Lake Erie.
- 5 October – War of 1812: William Henry Harrison defeats the British at the Battle of the Thames in Upper Canada; native leader Tecumseh is killed in battle.
- 7 October – Peninsular War: British troops enter France.
- 13 October – Cape of Good Hope becomes a British colony.
- 21 October – Nelson Monument, Liverpool unveiled.
- 12 December – Charlotte, Princess of Wales agrees to marry William, Prince of Orange. A dynastic match intended to strengthen ties with the Netherlands which had recently risen up against French rule
- 25 December – William Debenham joins Thomas Clark in a partnership to manage a draper's store in London, origin of the Debenhams business which will run department stores until 2020.
- 27 December – 3 January 1814 – A thick fog blankets London causing the Prince Regent to turn back from a trip to Hatfield House and a mail coach to take 7 hours to reach Uxbridge on its way to Birmingham.
- 29 December – War of 1812: British soldiers burn Buffalo, New York.
- 31 December
  - The foreign secretary, Lord Castlereagh, is sent to Germany with full powers to give assistance to the allies.
  - Westminster Bridge in London is illuminated by gas lighting provided by the Gas Light and Coke Company from the world's first public gasworks nearby.

=== Ongoing ===
- Napoleonic Wars, 1803–1815
- Peninsular War, 1808–1814

=== Undated ===
- Last striking of guinea coins, to pay Wellington's army in the Pyrenees.
- The early steam locomotive Puffing Billy introduced at Wylam colliery, County Durham.
- Society of Antiquaries of Newcastle upon Tyne established.
- Charles Waterton begins the process of turning his estate at Walton Hall, West Yorkshire, into what is, in effect, the world's first nature reserve.

== Publications ==
- 28 January – Jane Austen's novel Pride and Prejudice.
- Percy Bysshe Shelley's poem Queen Mab.
- Robert Owen's A New View of Society: Essays on the Formation of Human Character.
- Sarah Elizabeth Utterson's anthology Tales of the Dead.

== Births ==
- 4 January – Isaac Pitman, inventor of Pitman Shorthand (died 1897)
- 19 January – Henry Bessemer, metallurgist (died 1898)
- 15 March – John Snow, physician, pioneer epidemiologist (died 1858)
- 19 March – David Livingstone, Scottish missionary explorer (died 1873)
- 17 April – Mary Peters, née Bowley, hymn writer (died 1856)
- 21 May – Robert Murray M'Cheyne, Scottish clergyman (died 1843)
- 21 June – William Edmondstoune Aytoun, Scottish poet and academic (died 1865)
- 17 September – John Jabez Edwin Mayall, photographer (died 1901)
- 19 December – Thomas Andrews, chemist (died 1885)
- 29 December – Alexander Parkes, chemist (died 1890)
- Frederick Scott Archer, sculptor and pioneer photographer (died 1857)

== Deaths ==
- 17 June – Charles Middleton, 1st Baron Barham, sailor and politician (born 1726)
- 6 July – Granville Sharp, abolitionist (born 1735)
- 11 August
  - John Price, Welsh librarian (born 1735)
  - Henry James Pye, poetaster, Poet Laureate (born 1745)
- 23 August – Alexander Wilson, Scottish-born ornithologist (born 1766)
- 4 September – James Wyatt, architect (born 1746)
- 10 November – Francis Fane of Spettisbury, MP (born 1752)
- 17? November – William Franklin, last colonial governor of New Jersey (born 1730 in British North America)
