= Carlton House Fête =

1811 event in London

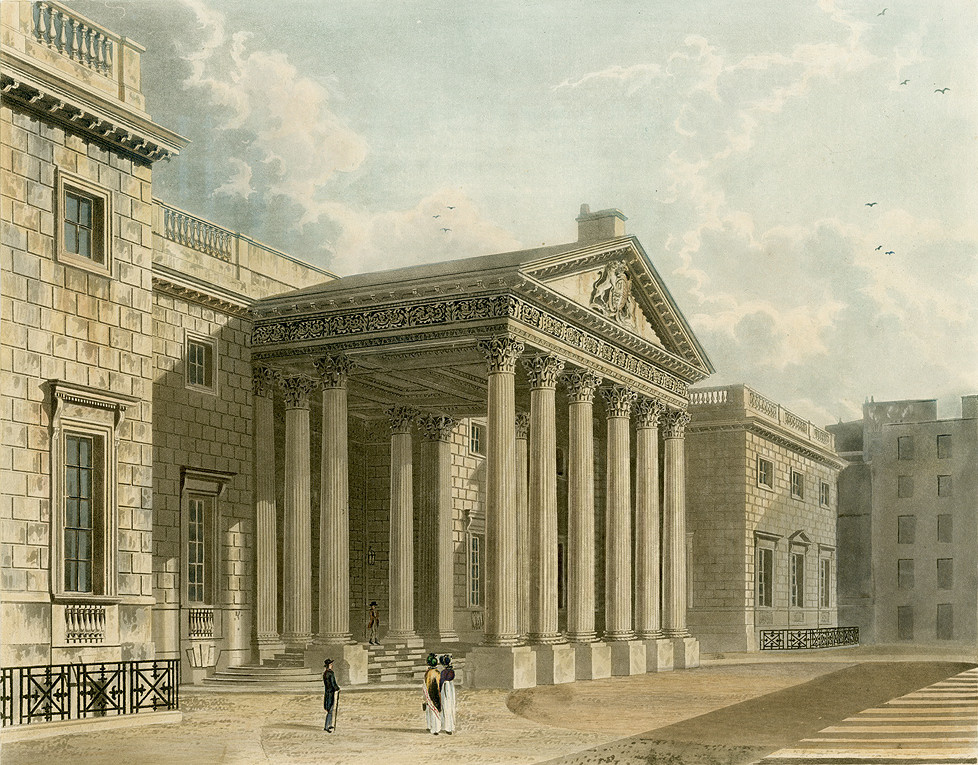
Entrance of Carlton House.

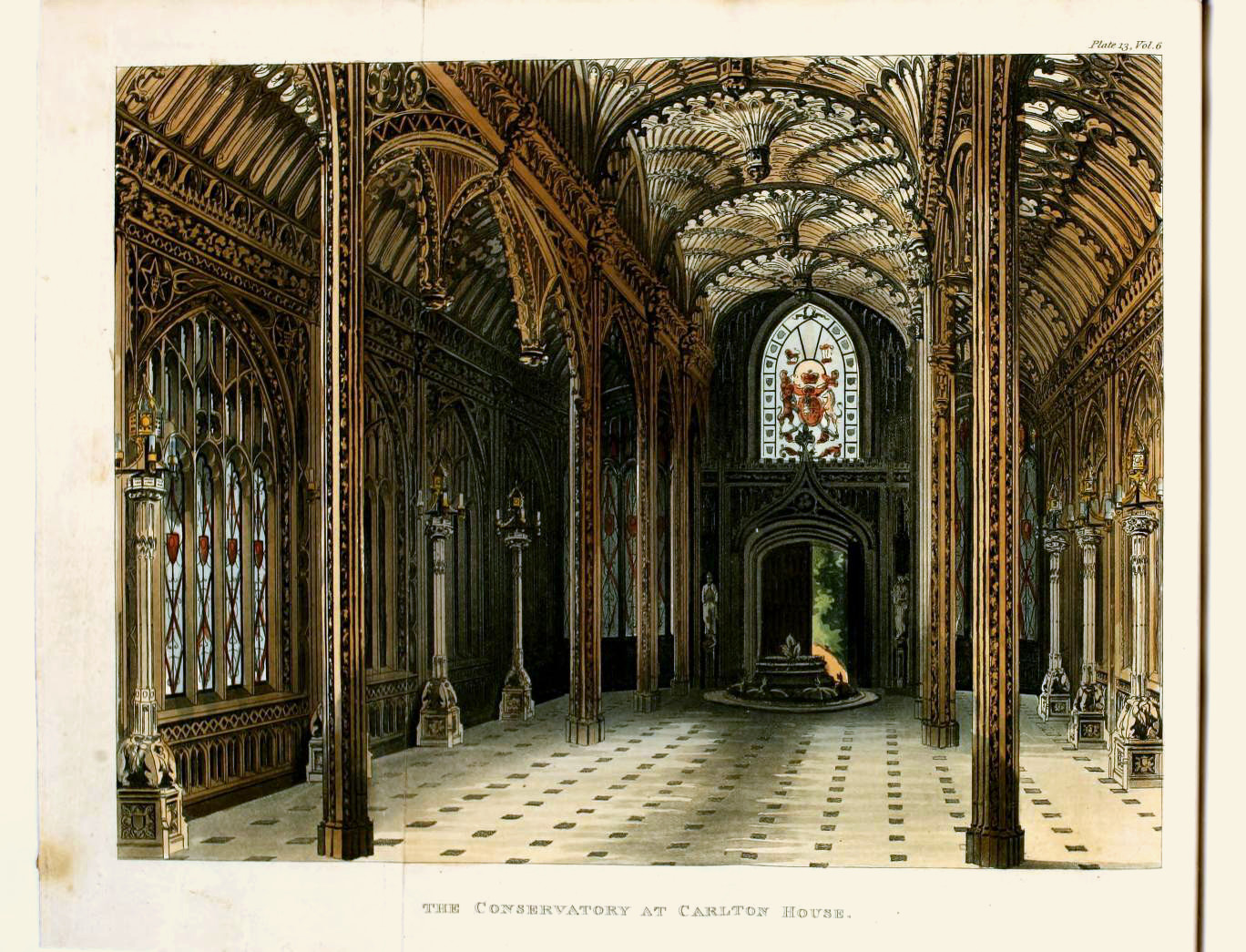
Conservatory of Carlton House, 1811. It hosted a large number of supper guests for the fête

The Carlton House Fête was hosted on 19 June 1811 by the Prince Regent, the future George IV, at his London residence Carlton House. Ostensibly held to honour the exiled Louis XVIII and French royal family, it functioned as a celebration of the establishment of George as Regent on behalf of his father George III. The lavish event set the tone amongst High Society during the Regency era.

== Background ==
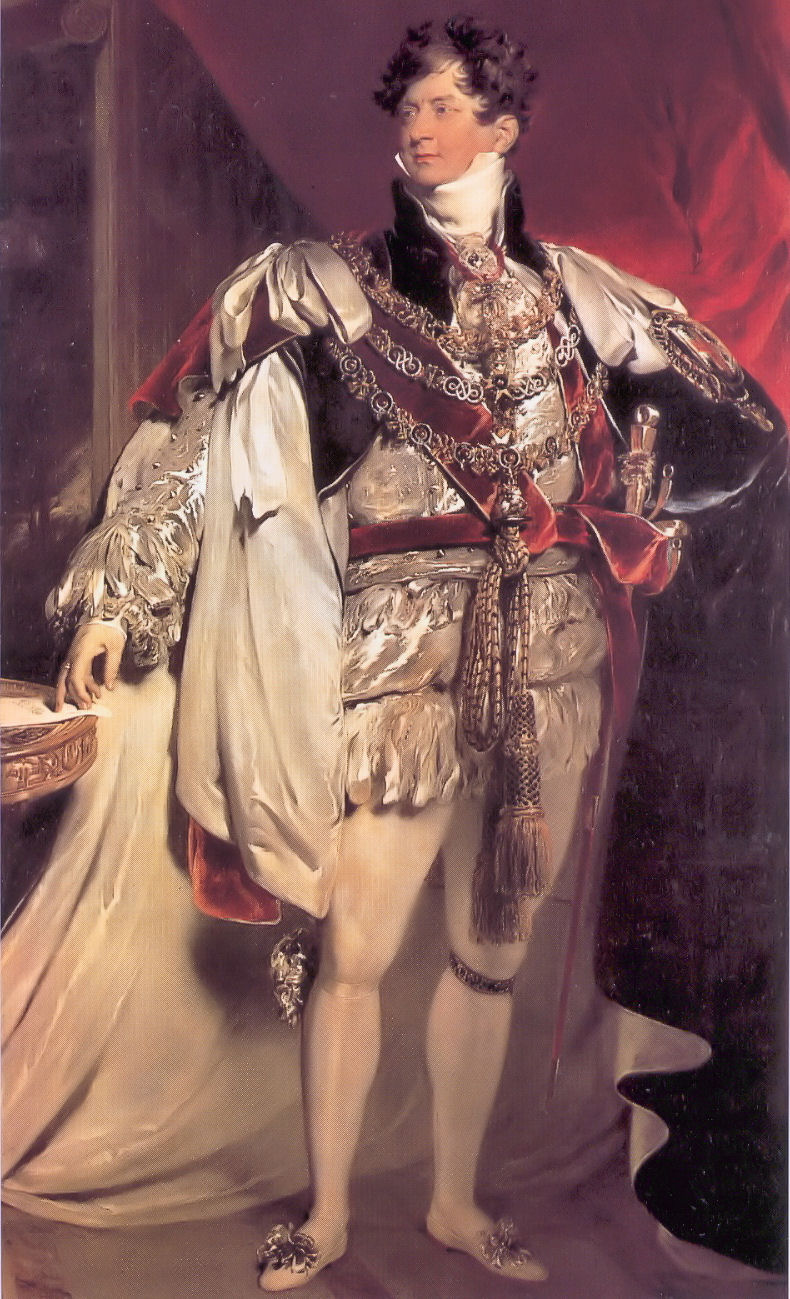
The Prince Regent by Thomas Lawrence, 1816.

In late 1810, George III suffered a recurrence of the mania that had affected him earlier in his reign. When it was clear that no immediate recovery was likely his eldest son and heir was made Regent in February 1811. Carlton House, George's residence as Prince of Wales had been rebuilt at great expense during his ownership. The architect John Nash would continue to make costly improvements during the Regency.

== Event ==
Two thousand guests were invited to Carlton House for the event which began on the summer evening and were admitted after showing their tickets.

George made his appearance at 9pm dressed in the uniform of a Field Marshal, a rank to which he had promoted himself soon after becoming Regent. He greeted his French guests and escorted them around the rooms of the house. As claimant to the French throne, Louis XVIII and his family had been living in exile in Britain which was at war with Napoleon's French Empire.

At 2:30am selected guests sat down to a supper in the Gothic conservatory. A huge water feature had been installed, giving the effect of a stream running the length of the room and filled with fish. Multiple courses were served to guests while a musical band concealed in the garden played throughout the meal.

The bulk of guests began to drift away around four in the morning but some didn't leave until later, such as the Irish poet Thomas Moore who stayed until six in the morning.

== Attendees ==
The event drew many of the aristocratic, artistic and political elite. The French royal visitors included Louis XVIII, his brother Charles, Count of Artois, Charles Ferdinand, Duke of Berry and Marie-Thérèse, Duchess of Angoulême.

George had long been associated with the opposition Whig party leadership and they attended Carlton House with high hopes of replacing the government of Spencer Perceval once the restrictions imposed on the Regency expired after a year and he gained the full powers of the monarch. Whigs in attendance included George Tierney and Samuel Romilly. Other guests included George's old friend Beau Brummell, the last time he was invited by the Regent to a social function.

Notable absentees included Maria Fitzherbert, who George had illegally married in 1785. He invited Fitzherbert, but his refusal to seat her at the top table was taken by her as a deliberate snub. George was long estranged from his wife Caroline of Brunswick, Princess of Wales who was then living separately in Blackheath and was not invited. George and Caroline's daughter, Princess Charlotte was deemed too young. Queen Charlotte, outraged by her son's celebration while her husband was suffering, stayed away and ordered her five unmarried daughters not to attend.

== Aftermath ==
For the next three days the public were allowed to enter the palace and gardens to view the decorations for the event. On the final day an estimated thirty thousand came leading to massive overcrowding. The regent continued to host major receptions at Carlton House over the decade, notably during the victory celebrations at the end of the Napoleonic Wars including the Allied sovereigns' visit to England in 1814. In 1820 he succeeded his father as King and had an elaborate coronation in 1821.

== See also ==
- Vittoria Fête, an 1813 celebration of a victory during the Peninsular War

== Bibliography ==
- David, Saul. Prince of Pleasure: The Prince of Wales and the Making of the Regency. Sharpe Books, 2018.
- Hibbert, Christopher Weinreb, Ben, Keay, John & Keay, Julia. The London Encyclopaedia. Pan Macmillan, 2011.
- Kelly, Ronan. Bard of Erin: The Life of Thomas Moore. Penguin Books, 2009.
- Smith, E.A. George IV. Yale University Press, 1999.
