= Juan Diéguez Olaverri =

Guatemalan writer

Juan Diéguez Olaverri, born on November 26, 1813, in Huehuetenango, Viceroyalty of New Spain was a Guatemalan poet. He pursued his education at the Colegio Seminario and later at the University of San Carlos and the Academia de Estudios, earning a law degree in 1836. His father, José Domingo Diéguez, was a lawyer and writer who signed the Guatemalan independence act in 1821. Olaverri's career included serving as a judge in Sacatépequez and later in Guatemala City.

He was exiled to Mexico due to his involvement in an assassination plot against Rafael Carrera, during which he wrote his famous poem "A los Cuchumatanes," expressing his love for his homeland. He returned to Guatemala, but died shortly afterwards, on June 28, 1866. Olaverri's legacy includes 54 original poems, published posthumously in 1893 under the title "Poesías de Juan Diéguez Olaverri" by Jorge Arriola. Some of his notable works include "A la Memoria del retratista Don Francisco Cabrera," "Treinta y Nueve Años," and "Oda a la Independencia."
