= Mary Elizabeth Lee =

American poet

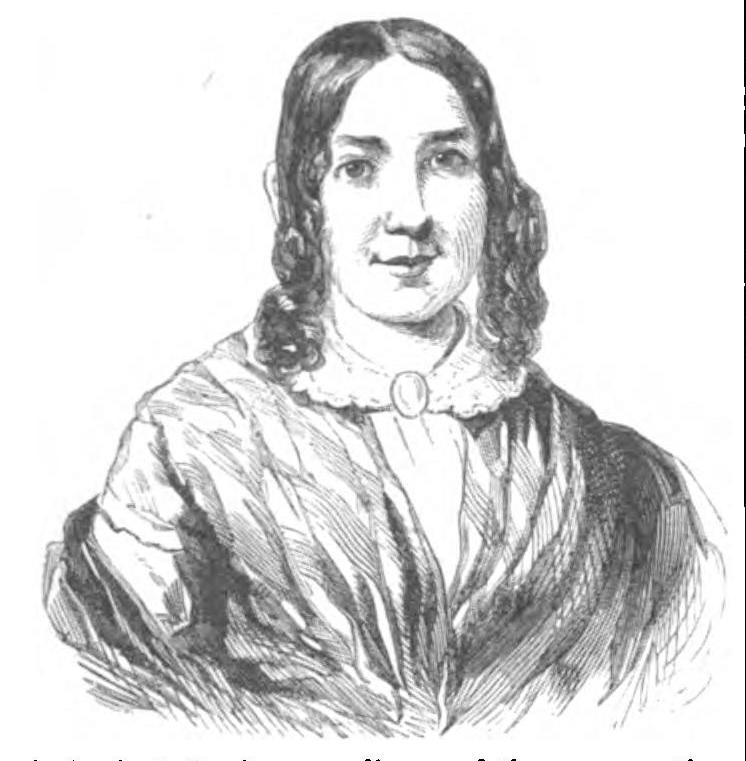
- Born: March 23, 1813
- Died: September 23, 1849 (aged 36)
- Occupation: Writer

Mary Elizabeth Lee (pen names, M.E.L. and A Friend; March 23, 1813 – September 23, 1849) was a 19th-century writer from the Southern United States. She produced prose, poetry, children's fiction, and translations. She contributed many short stories and poems to The Rosebud and other publications.

== Early life and education ==
Mary Elizabeth Lee was born at Charleston, South Carolina, March 23, 1813. She was the daughter of William Lee and niece of Judge Thomas Lee. She belonged to an old family of high social rank and intellectual culture of South Carolina.

On account of an extremely delicate organization and sensibility, Lee was carefully shielded from all rough contact with the world, not even being allowed to enter school until she was ten years of age. She was then placed in charge of Mr. A. Bolles, a successful teacher of young ladies, in Charleston. The advantages of the school-room seemed to unfold to her a new world of resource. Books became her passion. She made rapid progress in her studies, and gathered a store of varied knowledge for future use. About this time, she began to develop also great aptitude for the acquisition of languages, but her health gave way under the pressure of close application, and she was obliged to pursue a less systematic and rigorous course within the quiet precincts of her own home. But no obstacles checked her advancement in knowledge.

== Career ==
At the age of twenty, Lee became a contributor to The Rose Bud, a periodical edited by Mrs. Gilman, and gradually growing into marked favor with the public. At the same age, she began contributing to The Southern Rose, attracting attention. She also became a frequent contributor to Graham's Magazine, Godey's Lady's Book, and the Southern Literary Messenger. Lee used the pen names "M.E.L." and "A Friend".

Her first volume, entitled Social Evenings, or Historical Tales for Youth, was published in 1840 by the Massachusetts Board of Education School Library Association, and proved to be one of the most attractive in the collection. "Correggio's Holy Family" was one of her best, but possibly "The Hour of Death", and "The Death Bed of Prince Henry" better show her characteristics as a writer. The best known of her poetical pieces is thought to be "The Blind Negro Communicant." She produced a number of translations.

Determined to maintain herself in strict independence, she continued to write for northern and southern periodicals, until her health utterly failed. That she was possessed of an indefatigable and truly heroic spirit, may be learned from the fact that when her right hand became helpless from paralysis, she grasped the pen firmly with the left hand, acquired a new style of chirography, and continued to write.

== Death and legacy ==
After years of slow physical torture, Lee died in the midst of her family, at Charleston, September 23, 1849. The Poetical Remains of the late Mary Elizabeth Lee, with a Biographical Memoir by S. Gilman, D. D., was published after her death in 1851 (Charleston).

== Style ==
She published many poetical translations from the French, German and Italian, besides original poems, chiefly in the balled style, founded on Southern traditions. Regarding The Poetical Remains of the late Mary Elizabeth Lee, with a Biographical Memoir by S. Gilman, D. D., a review by The Christian Examiner and Religious Miscellany (1851) commented:— "Lee's poems are characterized by heartiness and simplicity rather than by any brilliancy or genius. Their topics are naturally found in the common scenes of life, and are treated with a healthful tone and with a pure spirit."
