= Vittoria Fête =

1813 event in London

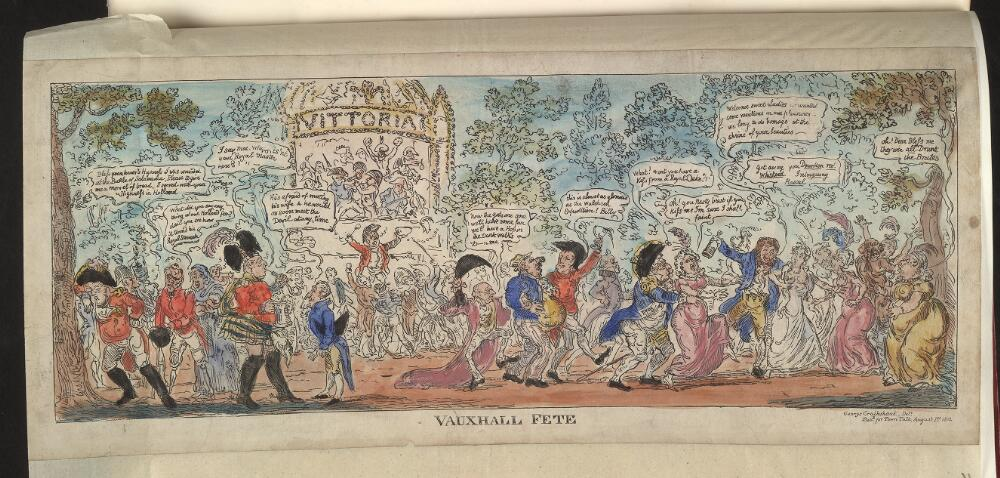
A satirical view of the celebrations by George Cruikshank

The Vittoria Fête was a public celebration held at Vauxhall Gardens in London on 20 July 1813. It was held to commemorate the victory at the Battle of Vittoria in Northern Spain during the Napoleonic Wars. The battle took place on 21 June during the Peninsular War and was a decisive victory for British-led forces under Lord Wellington. The Allies captured much of the French baggage including that of Joseph Bonaparte the French-imposed King of Spain. The victory enabled Wellington to move up to the border and, after heavy fighting, invade France in October 1813. George Cruikshank produced a satirical print based on the event.

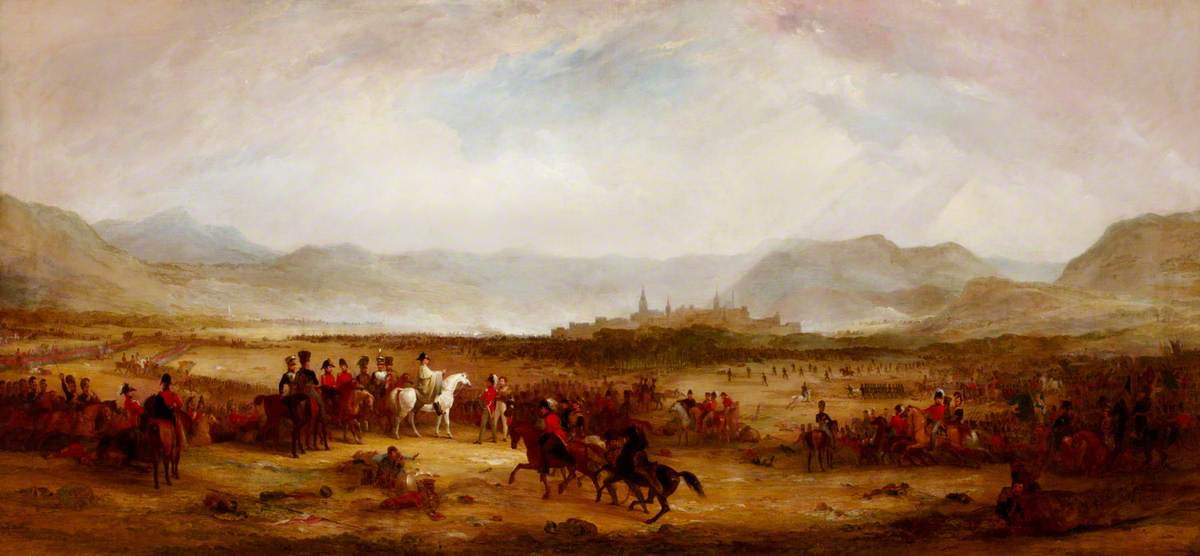
The Battle of Vittoria by George Jones, 1827

The pleasure gardens at Vauxhall, just south of the River Thames, were a fashionable location for the Regency elite. The following year further major celebrations were held in London during the Allied sovereigns' visit to England following the defeat of Napoleon.

== See also ==
- Carlton House Fête, held in 1811 to celebrate the beginning of the Regency era

== Bibliography ==
- Jorgensen, Anna & Keenan, Richard. Urban Wildscapes. Taylor & Francis, 2012.
- Laudermilk, Sharon H. & Hamlin, Teresa L. The Regency Companion. Garland, 1989.
- Reynolds, Luke. Who Owned Waterloo?: Battle, Memory, and Myth in British History, 1815–1852. Oxford University Press, 2022.
- Southworth, James Granville. Vauxhall Gardens: A Chapter in the Social History of England. Columbia University Press, 1941.
