= Mary Peters (hymn writer) =

- Born: 17 April 1813; Cirencester
- Died: 29 July 1856 (aged 43); Clifton

Mary Peters (17 April 1813 – 29 July 1856) was a British hymnwriter. She produced more than fifty hymns.

== Biography ==
Mary Bowly was born in Cirencester in 1813, to Richard and Mary Bowly.

She married John McWilliam Peters who was the vicar of Quenington and then Langford. Peters gave her efforts to writing and she wrote her hymns by the time she was thirty. She created a large history in seven volumes, covering the "point of creation to the start of Queen Victoria's reign", but her notability comes from her hymns.

Peters married John Peters at the age of 39 with a ceremony conducted by the Plymouth Brethren.

Peters died in Clifton in 1856.

== Selected works ==
- The World's History from the Creation to the Accession of Queen Victoria
- Hymns intended to help the Communion of Saints, 1847
