= Battle of Frenchman's Creek =

Battle of the War of 1812

Coordinates: 42.94227°N 78.92645°W

- Part of the War of 1812
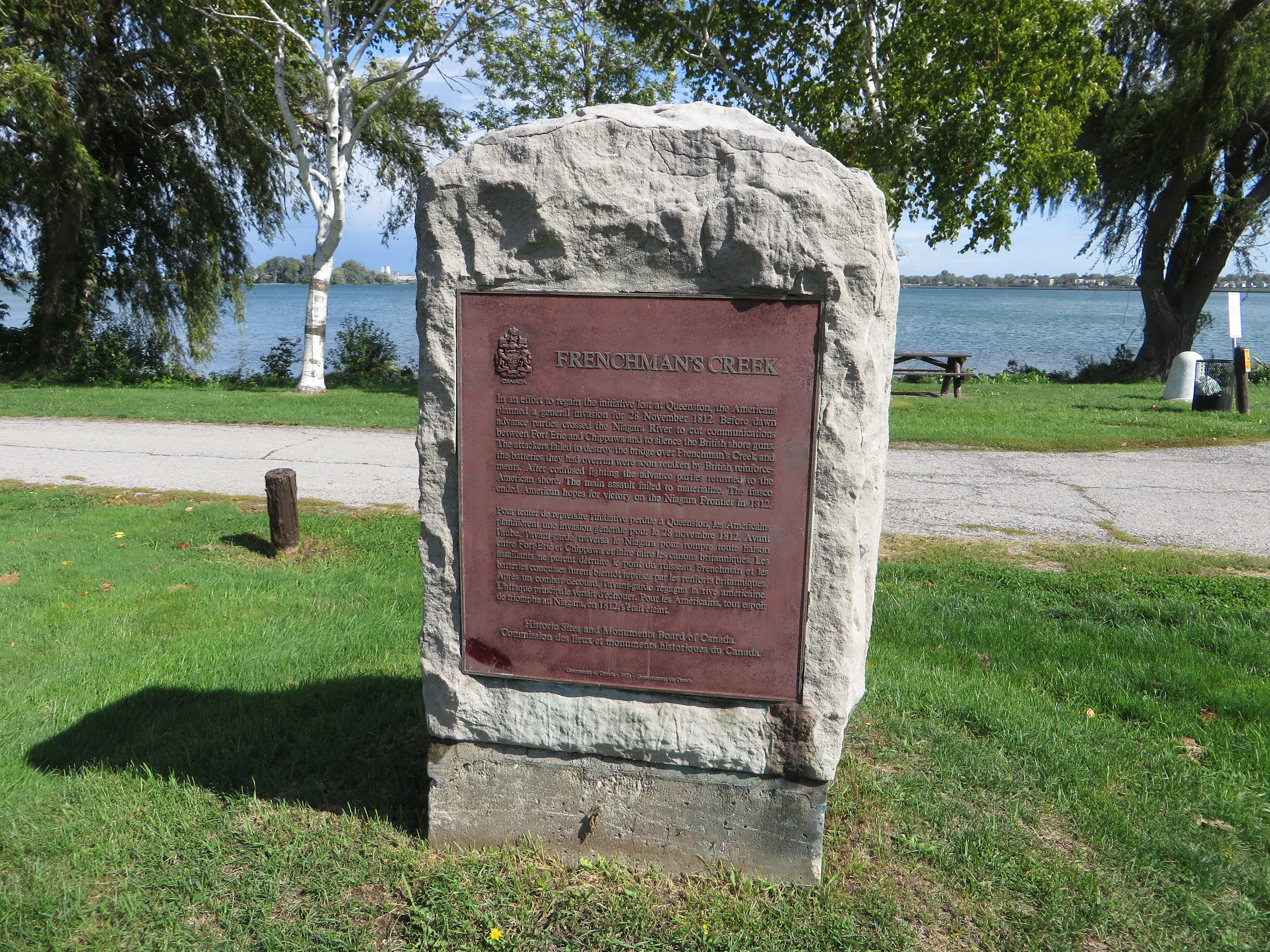
- Memorial at Frenchman's Creek, National Historic Site of Canada
Date	November 28, 1812
Location	Frenchman's Creek, in present day Fort Erie, Ontario, Canada
Result	American victory

Belligerents
United Kingdom; Upper Canada	United States

Commanders and leaders
Cecil Bisshopp	Alexander Smyth

Strength
c. 650	770

Casualties and losses
13 killed; 44 wounded; 34 captured	24 killed; 55 (known) wounded; 39 captured

The Battle of Frenchman's Creek took place during the War of 1812 between Great Britain and the United States in the early hours of November 28, 1812, in the Crown Colony of Upper Canada, near the Niagara River. The operation was conceived as a raid to prepare the ground for a larger American invasion. The Americans succeeded in crossing the Niagara and landing at both of their points of attack. They achieved one of their two objectives before withdrawing but the invasion was subsequently called off, rendering useless what had been accomplished. The engagement was named, "the Battle of Frenchman's Creek" by the Canadians, after the location of some of the severest fighting. To contemporary Americans, it was known as, "the Affair opposite Black Rock".

The battle site was designated a National Historic Site of Canada in 1921.

== Background ==
After the American defeat at the Battle of Queenston Heights, command of the U.S. Army of the Centre on the Niagara Frontier passed from Major General Stephen Van Rensselaer of the New York Militia to his second-in-command, Brigadier General Alexander Smyth of the Regular U.S. Army. Smyth had deeply resented being subordinated to a militia officer and this was the opportunity for which he had been waiting. He immediately planned to invade Canada with 3,000 troops. Assembling his forces at Buffalo, he directed a two-pronged attack in advance of his main invasion. Captain William King, with 220 men, was to cross the Niagara and spike the batteries at the Red House, beside Fort Erie, in order to enable Smyth's main invasion force to land without facing artillery fire. At the same time, Lieutenant Colonel Charles Boerstler, with 200 men, was to land in Canada between Fort Erie and Chippawa and destroy the bridge over Frenchman's Creek in order to hinder the bringing-up of British reinforcements to oppose Smyth's landing.

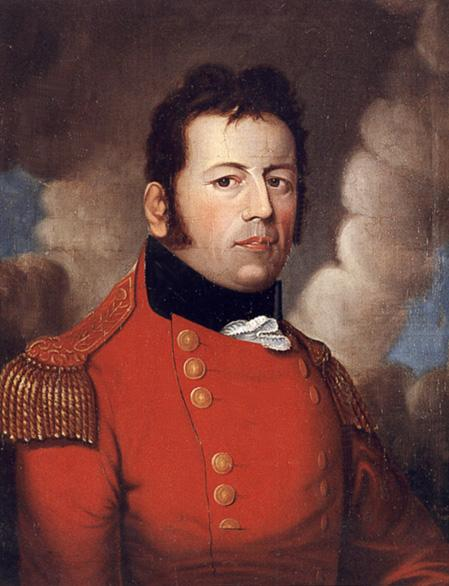
Lieutenant General George Prevost, the Governor General of the Canadas, forbade any offensive action on the Niagara frontier, leaving British forces no alternative but wait for an American attack.

The British commander-in-chief in North America, Lieutenant General Sir George Prevost, had forbidden any offensive action on the Niagara Frontier. This left the local British forces with no alternative but to wait for the Americans to make the first move and try to counter any attempt at invasion. The regular troops were distributed among the defensive outposts and supplemented with militia and Native American forces.

In a floridly worded proclamation, published on 10 November and addressed "To The Men of New York", Smyth wrote that, "in a few days the troops under my command will plant the American standard in Canada" and he urged New Yorkers not to "stand with your arms folded and look on in this interesting struggle" but to "advance…to our aid. I will wait for you a few days." Smyth's statement of intent appears to have attracted no attention from his opponents across the border.

== Opposing forces ==
Captain William King of the 13th U.S. Regiment of Infantry was detailed to attack the Red House with 150 troops and 70 U.S. Navy sailors under Lieutenant Samuel Angus. King's soldiers came from Captain Willoughby Morgan's company of the 12th U.S. Regiment of Infantry and Captains John Sproull and John E. Wool's companies of the 13th Regiment.

Lieutenant Colonel Charles Boerstler was directed against Frenchman's Creek with 200 men of his own 14th U.S. Regiment of Infantry. Colonel William H. Winder, commander of the 14th Regiment, was in reserve, with 350 of his own regiment.

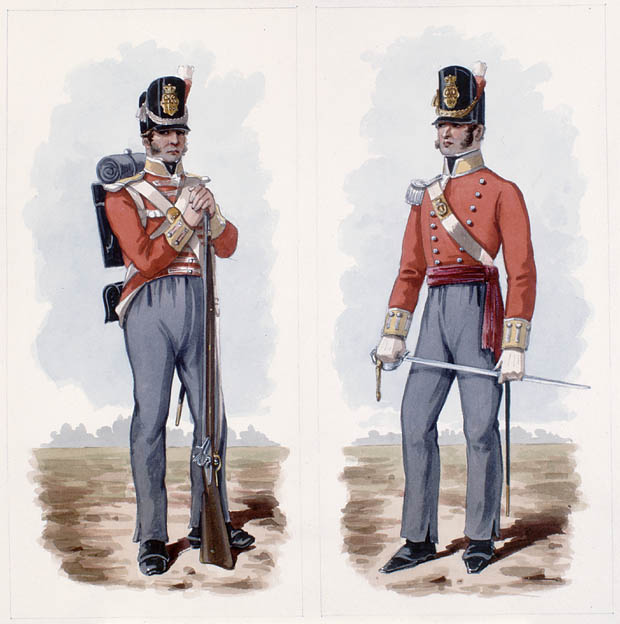
Depiction of a British private and officer of the period.

The British local commander, Lieutenant Colonel Cecil Bisshopp, was stationed at Chippawa, with a company of the 1st Battalion, 41st Regiment of Foot, two infantry companies of the 5th Lincoln Militia and a small detachment of Lincoln Militia Artillery. More of the 5th Lincoln Militia under Major Richard Hatt were posted nearby. In the area that would face attack on December 26, Bisshopp had several different detachments under his overall command. At Fort Erie were 80 of the 49th Regiment of Foot under Major Ormsby and 50 of the Royal Newfoundland Regiment under Captain Whelan. At Black Rock Ferry were two companies of Norfolk Militia under Captain John Bostwick. At the Red House, two-and-half miles from Fort Erie on the Chippawa Road, were 38 of the 49th Regiment under Lieutenant Thomas Lamont, some men of the Royal Regiment of Artillery under Lieutenant King, and some militia artillerymen. Lamont's battery mounted two guns: an 18-pounder and a 24-pounder; while King's battery mounted a 6-pounder and a 3-pounder. Further along the Chippawa Road, about four-and-a-half miles from Fort Erie, lay the post at Frenchman's Creek, garrisoned by 38 more men of the 49th Regiment under Lieutenant J. Bartley. Not far away were 70 of the light infantry company of the 41st Regiment under Lieutenant Angus McIntyre.

== Battle ==
=== King's Attack ===
Only part of Captain King's force, including 35 of Lieutenant Angus's 70 sailors, succeeded in making a landing at the Red House. Under fire from the defenders, the invaders charged Lieutenant Lamont's detachment of the 49th Regiment. The sailors, armed with pikes and swords, closed in for hand-to-hand fighting. Lamont's troops drove back the attackers three times but King made a fourth assault which hit the British left flank and overwhelmed them; capturing Lamont and killing, taking or dispersing all of his men. The victorious Americans set fire to the post, spiked the guns and set off back to the landing-point, where they expected their boats to have re-landed in order to evacuate them. However, in the moonless darkness, King's force became dispersed and split into two parties: one led by King and the other by Lieutenant Angus. Angus returned to the landing-point and found only four of the party's ten boats there. Unaware that the six missing boats had not in fact landed, Angus assumed that King had already departed, and he re-crossed the river in the remaining boats. When King's party reached the landing-point, they found themselves stranded. A search downriver found two unattended British boats, in which King sent half of his men, and the prisoners that he had captured, over the Niagara while he waited with his 30 remaining men for more boats to come from Buffalo and pick him up.

=== Boerstler's Attack ===
Lieutenant Colonel Boerstler made for Frenchman's Creek but four of his eleven boats, "misled by the darkness of the night or the inexperienced rowers being unable to force them across the current, fell below, near the bridge and were forced to return". Nevertheless, Boerstler's seven remaining boats forced a landing, opposed by Lieutenant Bartley and his 37 men of the 49th Regiment. Boerstler led the attack, shooting with his pistol a British soldier who was about to bayonet him. Bartley's outnumbered force retired, pursued to the Frenchman's Creek Bridge by the Americans, who took two prisoners. Boerstler's men were then attacked by Captain Bostwick's two companies of Norfolk Militia, who had advanced from Black Rock Ferry. After an exchange of fire in which Bostwick's force lost 3 killed, 15 wounded and 6 captured, the Canadians retreated. Boerstler now encountered another problem: many of the axes provided for the destruction of the Frenchman's Creek bridge were in the four boats that had turned back and those that were in the seven remaining boats had been left behind when the Americans fought their way ashore. Boerstler dispatched eight men under Lieutenant John Waring to "break up the bridge by any means which they could find". Waring had torn up about a third of the planking on the bridge when it was learned from a prisoner that "the whole force from Fort Erie was coming down upon them". Boerstler quickly re-embarked his command and rowed back to Buffalo, leaving behind Waring and his party at the bridge.

=== British response ===
In response to the attack, Major Ormsby advanced from Fort Erie to Frenchman's Creek with his 80 men of the 49th Regiment, where he was joined by Lieutenant McIntyre's 70 light infantrymen, Major Hatt's Lincoln Militia and some British-allied Native Americans under Major Givins. Finding that Boerstler's invaders had already gone, and being unable to determine any other enemy presence in the pitch dark, Ormsby's 300 men remained in position until daybreak, when Lieutenant Colonel Bisshopp arrived from Fort Erie. Bisshopp led the force to the Red House, where they found Captain King and his men still waiting to be evacuated. Outnumbered by ten-to-one, King surrendered.

=== Winder's reinforcement ===
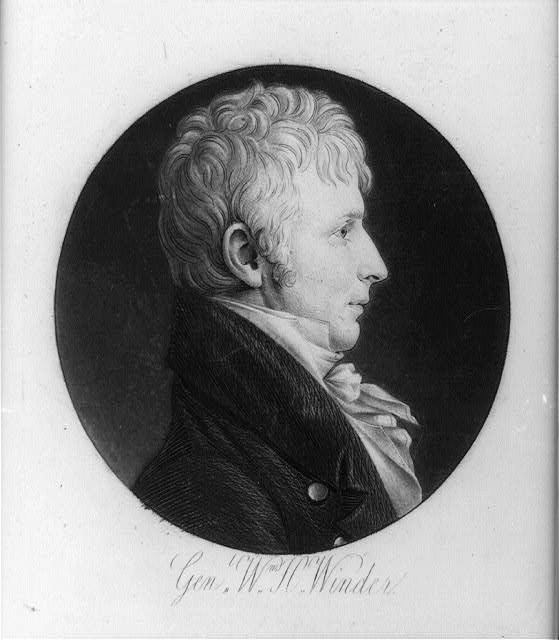
When news of the Americans' success arrived in Buffalo, Col William Winder was dispatched to evacuate the American forces at Frenchman's Creek.

When the news arrived in Buffalo that King had spiked the Red House batteries, General Smyth was overjoyed. "Huzza!" he exclaimed, "Canada is ours! Canada is ours! Canada is ours! This will be a glorious day for the United States!" and he dispatched Colonel Winder with his 350 men across the river to evacuate King and the rest of his force. Winder collected Lieutenant Waring and his party and then landed. However, he had only disembarked part of his force when Bisshopp's 300 men appeared. Winder ordered his men back to their boats and cast off for Buffalo but his command came under a severe fire as they rowed away, costing him 28 casualties.

In spiking the guns at the Red House battery, the Americans had accomplished the more important of their two objectives: an invading force could now land between Chippawa and Fort Erie without facing artillery fire. However, subsequent events would render their service useless.

== Casualties ==
The British official casualty return gave 15 killed, 46 wounded and 30 missing. As was often done in casualty returns with officers (but not with enlisted men), Lieutenant King of Royal Artillery and Lieutenant Lamont of the 49th were included in the "wounded" category although they were also taken prisoner. The Americans took 34 prisoners, including Lamont and King, which would indicate that two of the enlisted men who were thought to have been killed were in fact captured. This gives a revised British loss (with Lamont and King counted among the prisoners rather than the wounded) of 13 killed, 44 wounded and 34 captured.

Eaton's Compilation states that Captain King's command had 8 killed and 9 wounded; that Colonel Winder's detachment had 6 killed and 22 wounded but that the losses of Lieutenant Colonel Boerstler's detachment were unknown, being "nowhere stated" in the records. The New York Gazette of December 15, 1812, reported that, of Lieutenant Angus's 35 sailors who assaulted the Red House, 28 were killed or wounded, 2 were captured and only 5 escaped unscathed. Captain King (who was slightly wounded in the foot) and 38 other prisoners were taken by the British, The British reported that King and Angus's detachment left 12 killed behind them at the Red House (4 of whom were presumably from Angus's naval detachment) and that 18 American dead were recovered altogether. Since only 30 prisoners had surrendered along with King and since Winder's detachment did not come under fire until they had re-embarked and cast off for Buffalo, it would appear that 6 of the dead left on the battlefield and 8 of the prisoners belonged to Boerstler's command. The known American casualties (which include the killed and captured but not the wounded in Boerstler's detachment) therefore appear to have been 24 killed, 55 wounded and 39 captured.

== Aftermath ==
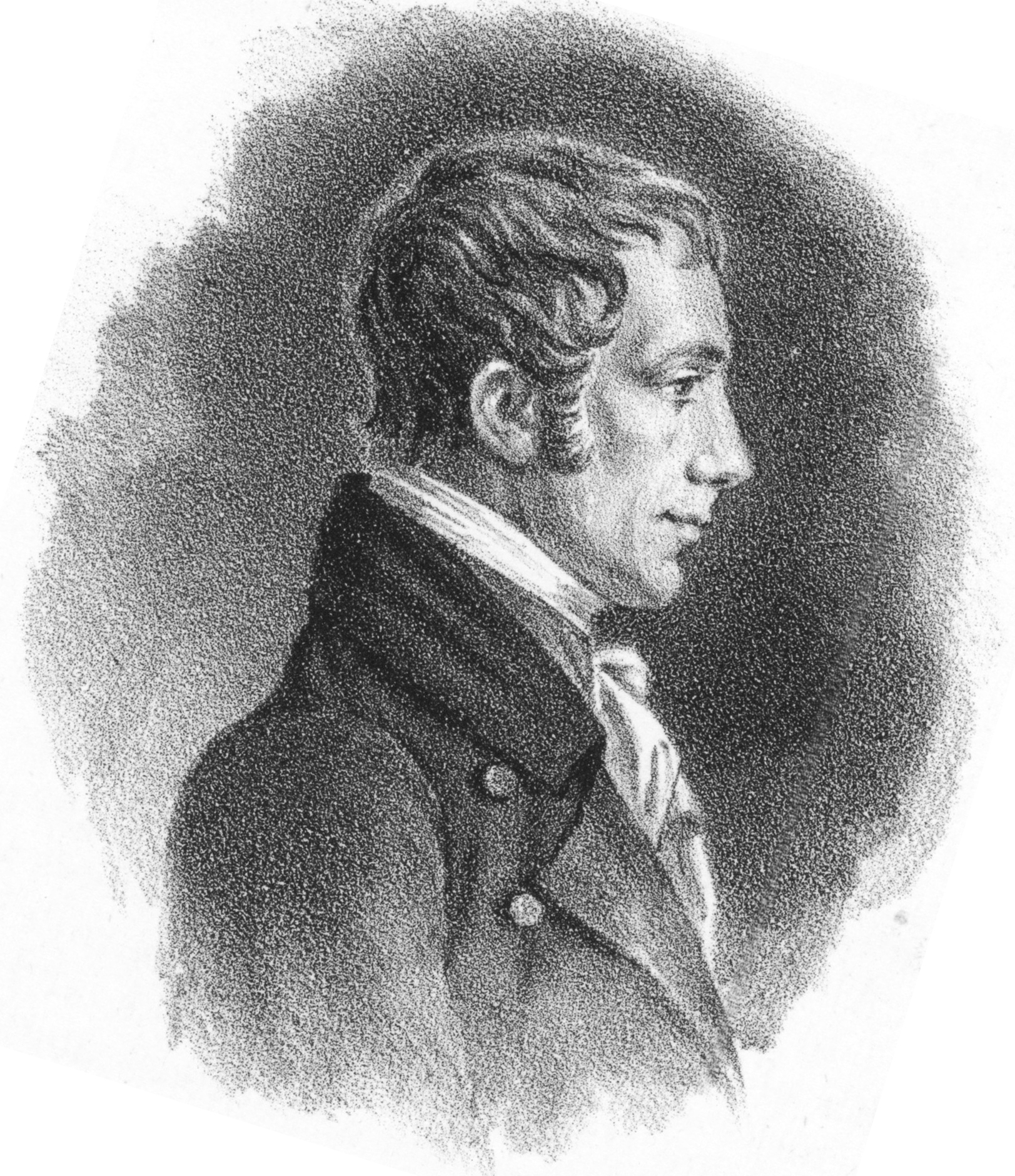
Following the raid, Brig Gen Alexander Smyth pressed on with plans for invasion against Upper Canada. However, the invasion failed to materialize, due to poor logistics, weather, and a drop in troop morale.

With the Red House batteries out of action, Smyth immediately pressed on with his invasion plans. However, attempts to embark his 3,000 men ended in chaos; with only 1,200 men managing to board because of a shortage of boats and the artillery taking up an unexpected amount of space on board. Amid torrential rain and freezing cold, a council of war headed by Smyth decided to postpone the invasion pending more thorough preparations that would enable the embarkation of whole force.

On November 30, Smyth tried again, ordering his men to embark two hours before dawn in order to avoid enemy fire. This time, the embarkation was so slow that, two hours after daylight, only 1,500 men were on board. Rather than attempt an amphibious landing in broad daylight, Smyth once again postponed the invasion. By this time, morale in Smyth's command had plummeted: "all discipline had dissolved; the camp was a bedlam". This, and widespread illness among the troops, persuaded a second council of war called by Smyth to suspend all offensive operations until the army was reinforced.

The Army of the Centre went into winter quarters without attempting any further offensive operations and General Smyth requested leave to visit his family in Virginia. Three months later, without Smyth either resigning his commission or facing a court-martial, his name was dropped from the U.S. Army rolls by President James Madison.

Unaware of the American intentions, the British and Canadians thought that King, Boerstler and Winder had been intended as the first wave of Smyth's invasion rather than as a preparatory raid. The Canadian press praised the "gallant achievement" of the defenders in apparently repulsing the Americans and singled out Bisshopp for particular congratulation. In his dispatch to Prevost, Major General Sir Roger Hale Sheaffe, the British commander in Upper Canada, wrote that "Lieut.-Colonel Bisshopp deserves high commendation for the spirit and activity he displayed, and great credit is due the officers and men who acted under his orders." Bisshopp was killed the following summer while leading the Raid On Newport.

Seven active infantry battalions of the Regular Army (1-2 Inf, 2-2 Inf, 1-4 Inf, 2-4 Inf, 3-4 Inf, 1-5 Inf and 2-5 Inf) perpetuate the lineages of several American infantry regiments (the old 13th, 20th and 23rd Infantry Regiments) that were at the Battle of Frenchman's Creek.

== Bibliography ==
- Cruikshank, Ernest (1971). The Documentary History of the Campaigns upon the Niagara Frontier in the Year 1812. Part II. New York: Arno Press Inc. ISBN 0-405-02838-5.
- Eaton, Joseph H. (2000). Returns of Killed and Wounded in Battles or Engagements with Indians and British and Mexican Troops, 1790-1848, Compiled by Lt. Col J. H. Eaton (Eaton’s Compilation). Washington, D.C.: National Archives and Records Administration Microfilm Publications.
- Heitman, Francis B. (1965) [1903]. Historical Register and Dictionary of the United States Army, from its Organization, September 29, 1789, to March 2, 1903. (Two volumes). Urbana, IL: University of Illinois Press.
- James, William (1818). A full and correct account of the military occurrences of the late war between Great Britain and the United States of America - Volume 1. London: Published for the Author. OL 6918202M.
- Malcomson, Robert (2003). A Very Brilliant Affair: The Battle of Queenston Heights, 1812. Toronto: Robin Brass Studio. ISBN 1-896941-33-8.
- Quimby, Robert S. (1997). The U.S. Army in the War of 1812: An Operational and Command Study. East Lansing, MI: Michigan State University Press. ISBN 0-87013-441-8.
- Zaslow, Morris (1964). The Defended Border: Upper Canada and the War of 1812. Toronto: The Macmillan Company of Canada Limited. ISBN 0-7705-1242-9.
