= List of Regular Army units with campaign credit for the War of 1812 =

Twenty-three currently active battalions of the Regular Army earned credit for campaigns during the War of 1812: two Air Defense Artillery battalions, six Field Artillery Battalions and seventeen Infantry battalions. These twenty-three battalions represent two Air Defense Artillery, four Field Artillery and seven Infantry regiments. Three additional Air Defense Artillery regiments have been awarded shared credit for War of 1812 campaigns, but the lineages of the artillery companies that earned those credits have not been perpetuated by currently active battalions. There are also twenty-four Army National Guard units with campaign credit for the War of 1812.

== Air Defense Artillery ==
When the War of 1812 began, the Regular Army contained four regiments of artillery: the 1st, 2nd and 3rd Regiments of Artillery, and the Regiment of Light Artillery. In March 1814 the 1st, 2nd and 3rd Regiments were combined to form the Corps of Artillery, consisting of forty-eight companies; the Regiment of Light Artillery consisted of ten companies.

Only a few companies from the 1st and 2nd Regiments of Artillery functioned regularly as "mobile" artillery, that is, in support of an infantry attack. Most of the time during the War of 1812 artillery was used as "position" artillery to repel an attack by enemy infantry. Artillery companies also often fought as infantry. Indeed, the 1st Regiment of Artillery served primarily as infantry in New York and along the Canada–US border, and the Regiment of Light Artillery, rather than functioning as a mobile horse artillery, was reorganized as infantry by the end of the war.

During a major reorganization of the Army in 1821, the Corps of Artillery and the Regiment of Light Artillery were abolished, and four new artillery regiments were constituted: the 1st, 2nd, 3rd and 4th Regiments of Artillery. These four regiments were the precursors of the present-day 1st, 2nd, 3rd and 4th Air Defense Artillery Regiments. The four new regiments constituted in 1821 were organized from existing artillery companies that had served in the War of 1812. As a consequence, even though these four Air Defense Artillery Regiments do not trace their lineages back to artillery formations that existed during the War of 1812, all four have been awarded shared credit for War of 1812 campaigns because of the service of their component elements that do date back to the War of 1812 or earlier.

Of the fourteen companies that survived into the twenty-first century as Air Defense Artillery battalions, only two are currently active: 2-1 ADA and 3-4 ADA.

=== 1st Air Defense Artillery ===
Campaigns: Canada

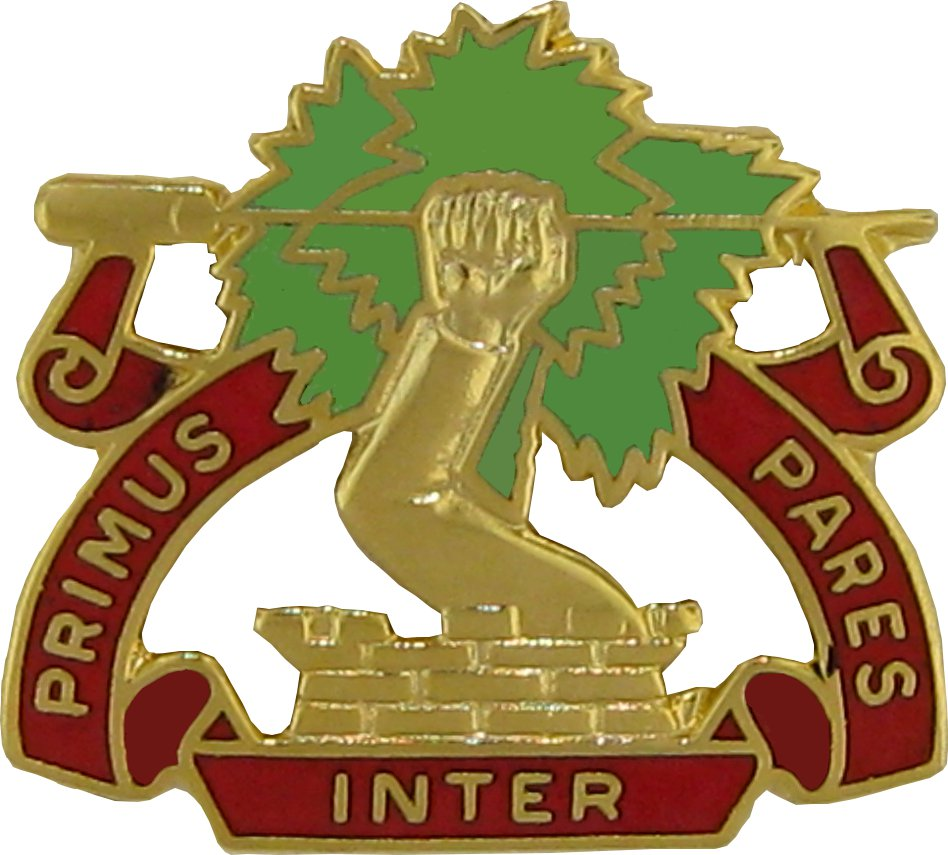
Distinctive Unit Insignia: 1 ADA

The 1st Air Defense Artillery traces its lineage back to June 1, 1821, when the 1st Regiment of Artillery was organized at Fort Independence, Massachusetts, from existing companies dating back to the War of 1812 or earlier. Three of the companies used to form the new 1st Regiment of Artillery in 1821 were artillery companies that served along the Canada–US border during the War of 1812: Captain Ichabod B. Crane's Company, 3rd Regiment of Artillery; Captain Robert G. Hite's Company, 3rd Regiment of Artillery, constituted on January 11, 1812; and Captain Francis Stribling's Company of Light Artillery, organized in 1814

Cranes' Company is the antecedent of today's 2-1 ADA; Hite's Company, of 6-1 ADA; and Stribling's Company, of 7-1 ADA. Only one of these battalions is currently active: 2-1 ADA.

==== 2-1 ADA ====
Campaigns (earned): Canada

2-1 ADA traces its lineage to Captain Ichabod Crane's Company, 3rd Regiment of Artillery, constituted January 11, 1812, and organized in July, 1812. Crane's Company was redesignated May 12, 1814, as Captain Ichabod Crane's Company, Corps of Artillery. During the War of 1812 Crane's Company, along with several other companies from the 3rd Regiment of Artillery, moved from its cantonment in New York to Sackett's Harbor for service along the Niagara Frontier. These companies, fighting as infantry, participated in the capture of York (west of present-day Toronto) and Fort George (located in Canada at the mouth of the Niagara River).

2-1 ADA is a Patriot battalion serving as an element of the 35th Air Defense Artillery Brigade, stationed at Camp Carroll, South Korea.

=== 2nd Air Defense Artillery ===
Campaigns: Canada

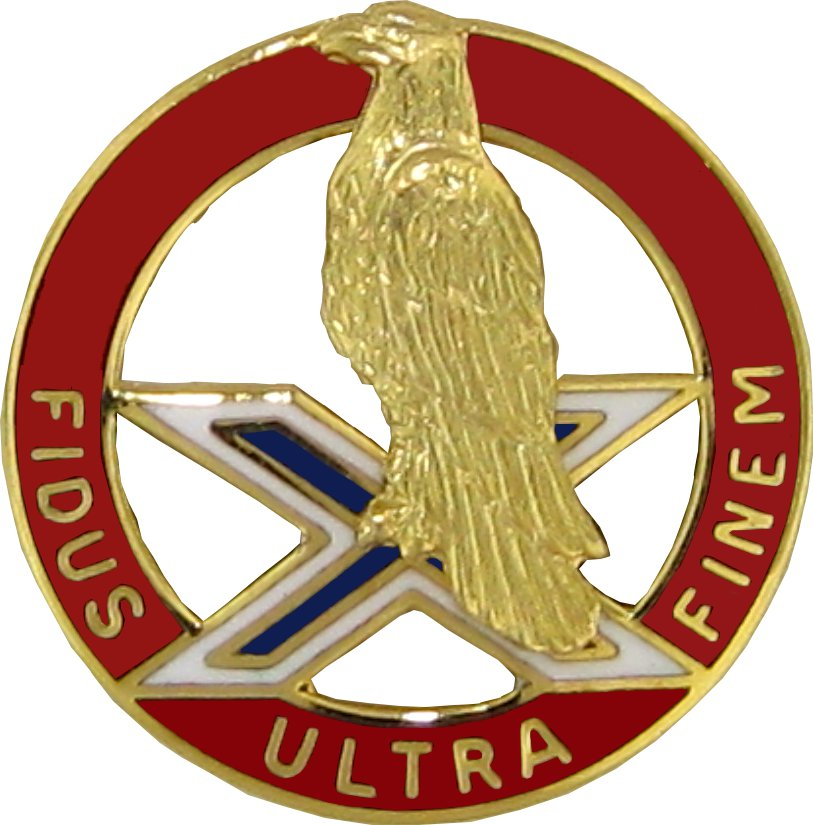
Distinctive Unit Insignia: 1 ADA

The 2nd Air Defense Artillery traces it lineage back to June 1, 1821, when the 2nd Regiment of Artillery was organized at Baltimore, Maryland, from existing companies, a number of which dated back to the War of 1812 or earlier. Three battalions of the 2nd Air Defense Artillery are derived from artillery companies that saw action along the Canada–US border: Brevet Lieutenant Colonel Nathan Towson's Company, 2nd Regiment of Artillery, constituted on January 11, 1812; a company in the 1st Regiment of Artillery commanded by Captain Lloyd Beal, Captain Samuel T. Dyson, 3rd Lieutenant Moses M. Russell and Captain Frederick Evans in the 1st Regiment of Artillery, originally organized in 1810 as Captain Lloyd Beal's Company; and a company in the 3rd Regiment of Artillery commanded by Captain Thomas Stockton and Captain Benjamin Pierce, constituted on January 11, 1812, as Captain Thomas Stockton's Company.

Towson's Company was the precursor of today's 2-2 ADA; Beal's/Dyson's/Russel's/Evans' Company, of the 4th Howitzer Battalion, 2 ADA; and Stockton's/Pierce's Company, of the 6th Missile Battalion, 2 ADA. None of these battalions is currently active.

Lieutenant Colonel Towson emerged as one of the most competent artillery officers in the American Army. His company distinguished itself at the Battles of Chippewa and Lundy's Lane. Credit for these two campaigns is not shared with the 2nd Air Defense Artillery Regiment, since shared credit is awarded only when at least two subordinate elements of the regiment have earned that credit.

=== 3rd Air Defense Artillery ===
Campaigns: Canada

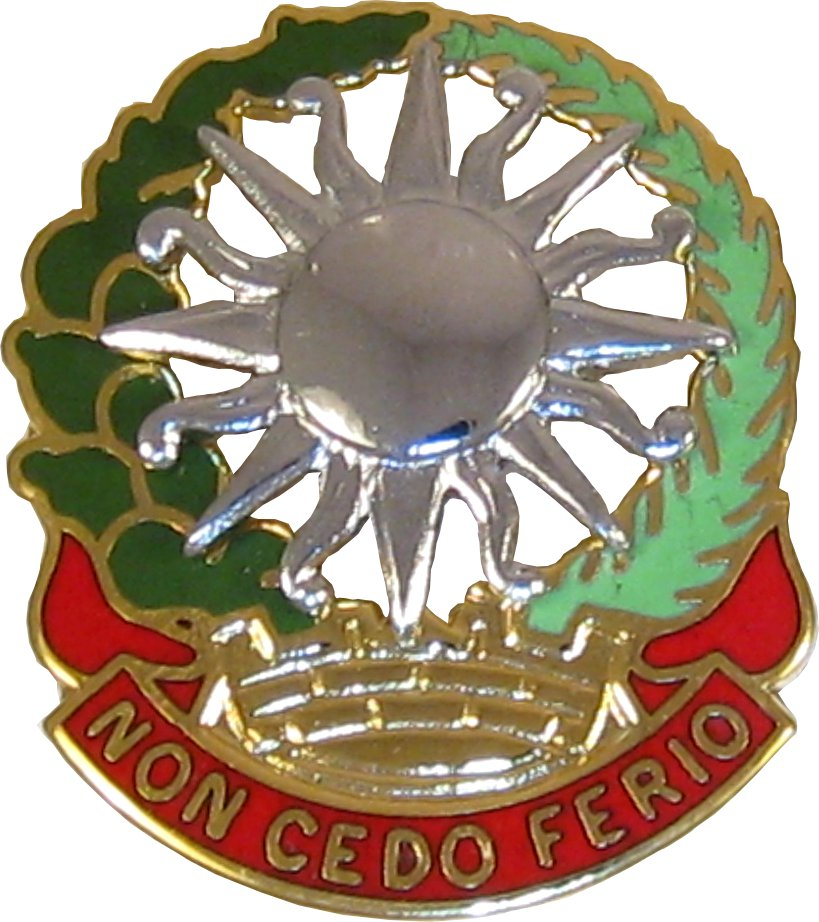
Distinctive Unit Insignia: 3 ADA

The 3rd Air Defense Artillery was constituted on June 1, 1821, as the 3rd Regiment of Artillery and organized from existing units with headquarters at Fort Washington, Maryland. Two of the companies used to form the new 3rd Regiment of Artillery in 1821 were artillery companies that had earned credit for the Canada Campaign through service along the Canada–US border: Captain Addison B. Armistead's Company, 2nd Regiment of Artillery, originally constituted in 1798 as Captain John Lillie's Company, 2nd Regiment of Artillerists and Engineers, which, after several redesignations became Captain Addison Armistead's Company, 2nd Regiment of Artillery on January 11, 1812; and Captain A. C. W. Fanning's Company, 3rd Regiment of Artillery, constituted on January 11, 1812, as a company in the 3rd Regiment of Artillery and organized in Sacketts Harbor, New York, in July, 1812, and redesignated as Captain Fanning's Company, Corps of Artillery in May, 1814.

Fanning's Company played an important role in the defense of Fort Erie during Major General Jacob Brown's invasion of the Niagara Peninsula in 1814.

Armistead's Company was the precursor of the 1-3 ADA; Fanning's Company, of the 2-3 ADA. Neither 1-3 ADA nor 2-3 ADA is currently active.

=== 4th Air Defense Artillery ===
Campaigns: Louisiana 1815

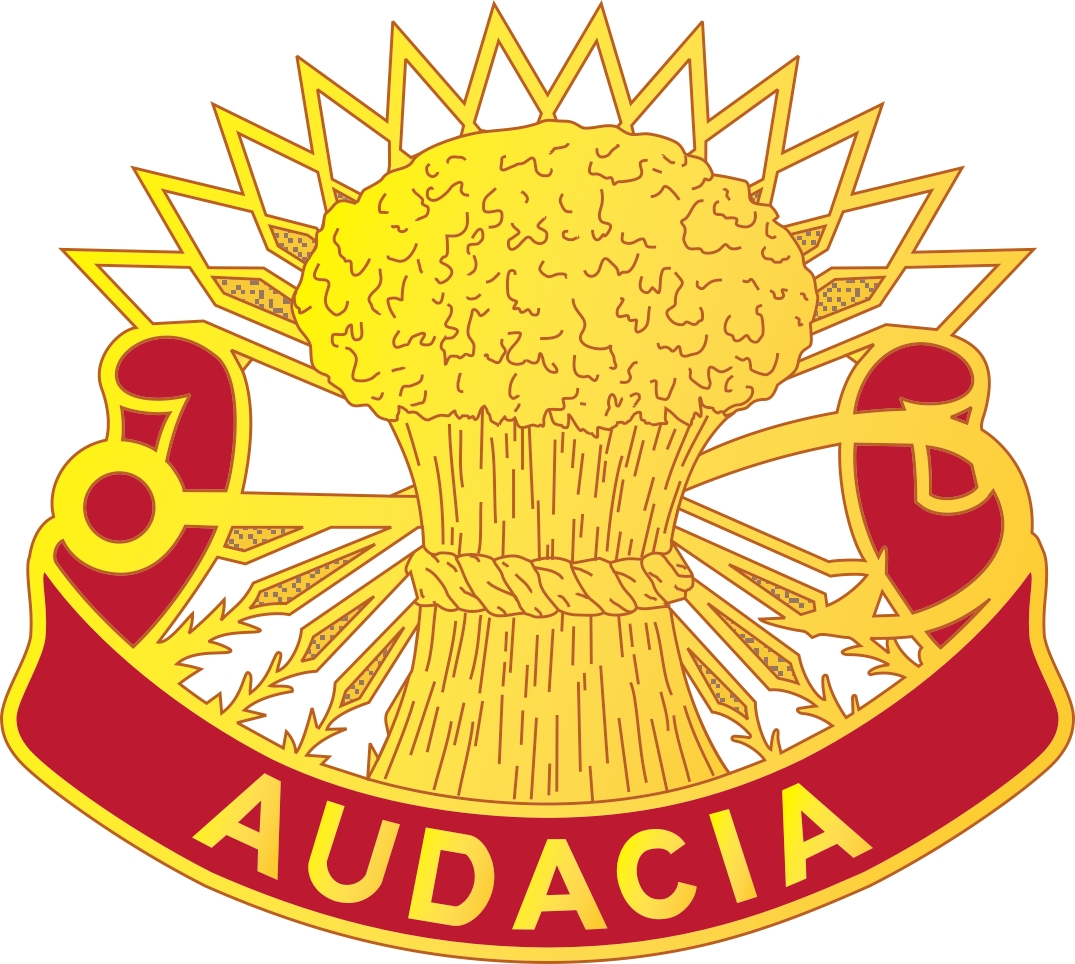
Distinctive Unit Insignia: 4 ADA

The 4th Air Defense Artillery traces its lineage back to June 1, 1821, when 4th Regiment of Artillery was constituted in the Regular Army and organized from existing units with headquarters at Pensacola, Florida. Two battalions of the 4th Air Defense Artillery are derived from artillery companies that served in the War of 1812: Captain Thomas Murray's Company, 1st Regiment of Artillery, originally constituted on October 20, 1786, and organized at West Point, New York, as Captain Henry Burbeck's Company of Artillery; and Captain James Barker's Company, 2nd Regiment of Artillery, constituted on January 11, 1812.

Murray's Company and Barker's Company are the antecedent of today's 1-4 and 3-4 ADA, respectively. Only one of these battalions is currently active: 3-4 ADA.

The credit for the Louisiana (1815) Campaign awarded to the 4th Air Defense Artillery is shared credit earned by Captain Thomas Murray's Company, which was at Fort St. Philip, a fort below New Orleans about thirty miles from the mouth of the Mississippi River, when it was subjected to a prolonged bombardment by British warships on January 5, 1815, and Captain Charles Wollstonecraft's Companies. Wollstonecraft's Company is the predecessor of a battalion that is no longer in the 4th Air Defense Artillery. Wollstonecraft's Company ultimately became today's 1-5 FA, the oldest unit in the Regular Army. Its lineage and participation in the War of 1812 will be discussed in the section on the 5th Field Artillery.

The fact that a regiment can retain the battle honors earned by a subordinate unit that no longer serves in the regiment is due to a quirk in the rules for assigning campaign credits prior to 1898 that applied before the implementation of the Combat Arms Regimental System in 1957. The passage and display of regimental honors was governed by AR 870-5, which states that campaign participation credit that accrues to a color-bearing organization includes "credit earned by two or more of its guidon-bearing elements before 1898." Thus, the credit earned by Murray's and Wollstonecraft's Companies passed to the 4th Air Defense Artillery as a shared honor for all of its elements. AR 870-5 also states that "the honors of a color-bearing organization will not be changed by the removal of its organic elements." Therefore, the shared credit remains with the 4th Air Defense Artillery, even though one of the units that earned that credit has been removed from the regiment.

==== 3-4 ADA ====
Campaigns (earned): Canada

3-4 ADA traces its history back to a company in the 2nd Regiment of Artillery constituted on January 11, 1812, and organized in May as Captain James N. Barker's Company, 2nd Regiment of Artillery. Barker's Company was consolidated in late 1813 with Captain Spotswood Henry's Company, 2nd Regiment of Artillery (organized in 1812), with the consolidated unit designated as Capt. James. N. Barker's Company, 2nd Regiment of Artillery. In December 1813, Barker's Company was redesignated as Captain Samuel B. Archer's Company, 2nd Regiment of Artillery, and then as Captain Samuel B. Archer's Company, Corps of Artillery, on May 17, 1814.

Barker's Company participated in a number of actions along the Canadian–American border, including Queenston Heights (October 13, 1812), Fort George (May 27, 1813) and Stoney Creek (June 6, 1813). Since 3-4 ADA is the only battalion in the 4th Air Defense Artillery with credit for the Canada campaign, this credit is not shared with the regiment.

3-4 ADA is an air and missile defense battalion serving as an element of the 108th ADA Brigade, 32nd Army Air and Missile Defense Command, currently stationed at Fort Bragg, North Carolina.

=== 61st Air Defense Artillery ===
Campaigns: None

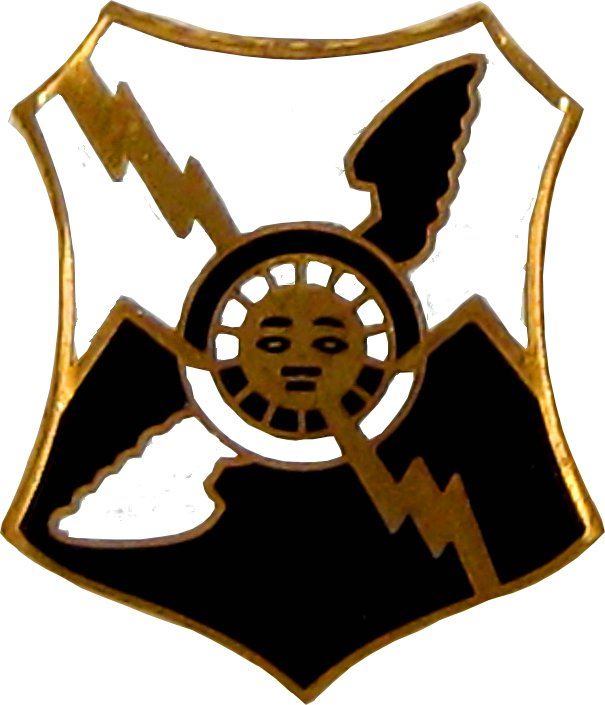
Distinctive Unit Insignia: 61 ADA

The 61st Air Defense Artillery traces its lineage to the 61st Artillery (Coast Artillery Corps), constituted on March 9, 1918, and organized at Fort Moultrie, South Carolina, from existing Regular Army and National Guard Companies from Georgia and South Carolina. The 61st Air Defense Artillery include a single battalion that is derived from a company that served in the War of 1812: 1-61 ADA.

1-61 ADA traces its history back to Captain Nathan Estabrook's Company of Light Artillery constituted in 1808. On March 1, 1811, Captain Nathan Estabrook's Company of Light Artillery was redesignated as Captain Robert H. MacPherson's Company of Light Artillery, which became Captain Luther Leonard's Company of Light Artillery in 1812.

Leonard's Company earned credit for the Canada Campaign as a consequence of its involvement in a number of actions along the Canada–US border, including the bombardment of Fort George and Smyth's failed attempt to cross the Niagara River to invade Canada.

61 ADA cannot be awarded shared credit for the Canada Campaign, since 1-61 ADA is the only battalion in the regiment with that credit.

=== 62nd Air Defense Artillery ===
Campaigns: Streamer without inscription

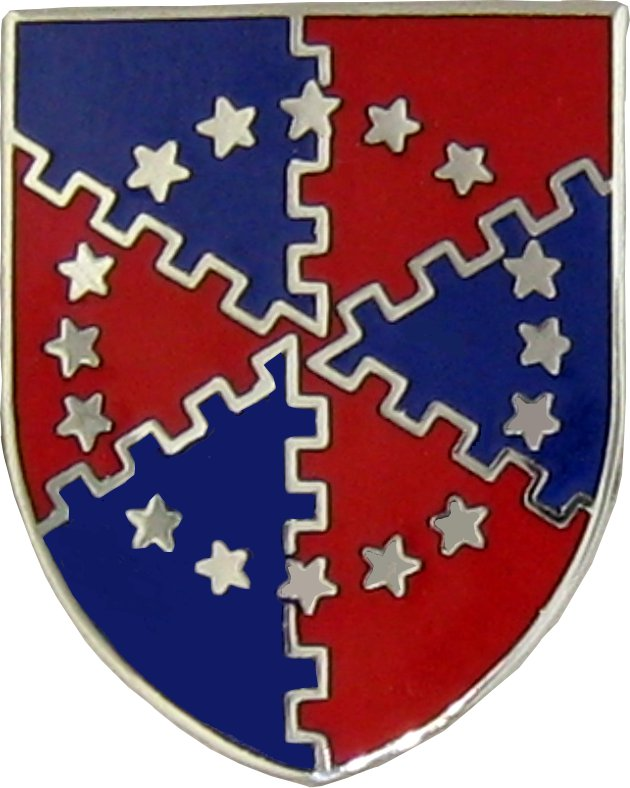
Distinctive Unit Insignia: 62 ADA

The 62nd Air Defense Artillery traces its lineage back to the 2nd Antiaircraft Artillery Battalion constituted on August 1, 1921, and organized from existing units at Fort Totten, New Jersey. Three battalions of the 62nd Air Defense Artillery are derived from artillery companies that served in the War of 1812: 1-62 ADA, derived from Captain James Hanham's Company, 1st Regiment of Artillery, originally constituted on April 27, 1798, and organized near Philadelphia, Pennsylvania, as Captain Callender Irvings's Company; 2-62 ADA, derived from a company in the Regiment of Light Artillery, first commanded by Captain James Gibson and later by Captain Arthur W. Thornton, initially organized on April 12, 1808, as Captain George Peters Company of Light Artillery constituted on April 12, 1808; and 3-62 ADA, descended from Captain John Goddall's Company, 2nd Regiment of Artillery, derived from a detachment of the 2nd Regiment of Artillery, organized in 1812 at Fort Independence, Massachusetts, under the command of 2nd Lieutenant William Smith. None of these battalions are currently active.

The Streamer without inscription is shared credit earned by 1-61 ADA and 3-61 ADA. 2-62 ADA earned credit for the Canada Campaign, but this credit is not shared with the regiment.

The six segments of the Distinctive Unit Insignia commemorate service in six wars of America's wars by subordinate units of the regiment, one of those wars being the War of 1812.

== Field Artillery ==
Following the War of 1812 a few artillery companies continued to serve with infantry units on the frontier, but the vast majority were redeployed to permanent defensive fortifications along the coast that had been built to defend port cities. None of these post-war units were equipped to function as "mobile" artillery. However, in France and Great Britain there was both a growing recognition of the potential value of field artillery and significant technological progress that made the development and use of light artillery feasible. Although the United States trailed the European powers in the creation of artillery units designed to function in the field with infantry and cavalry, ten of the forty-eight Regular Army Artillery companies that fought in the Mexican War were field artillery. And they performed very well indeed. By the time of the Civil War, the vast majority of the artillery on both sides was field artillery.

Between the end of the Civil War and the beginning of the twentieth century, the missions of "mobile" and "position" artillery continued to diverge, and finally in 1901 the existing artillery companies that constituted the Corps of Artillery were redesignated as either batteries of field artillery or companies of coast artillery. And then in 1907 Congress passed an act that created two separate branches of artillery: Field Artillery and Coast Artillery. Organizational change continue during the twentieth century as the military adjusted to the role of airplanes and missiles in warfare, leading eventually to the transformation of the Coast Artillery into the Air Defense Artillery.

Of the six artillery companies from the War of 1812 that survived into the twenty-first century as battalions in Field Artillery Regiments, four are currently active: 4-1 FA, 5-3 FA, 1-5 FA and 1-6 FA.

=== 1st Field Artillery ===
Campaigns: None

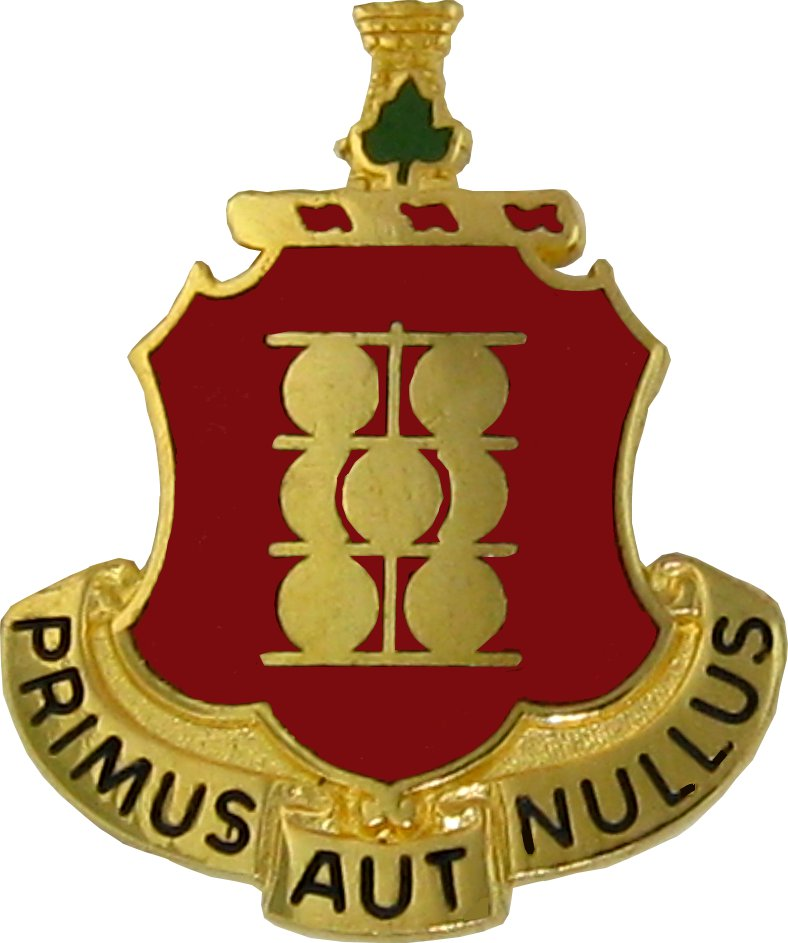
Distinctive Unit Insignia: 1 FA

The 1st Field Artillery was constituted on January 25, 1907, and organized from new and existing units at Fort Riley, Kansas. Two battalions of the 1st Field Artillery are derived from artillery companies that served in the War of 1812: 4-1 FA, derived from Captain Nathaniel Leonard's Company, 1st Regiment of Artillery; and 5-1 FA, derived from Captain Benjamin Ogden's Company, 3rd Regiment of Artillery, constituted on January 11, 1812. Only one of these two battalions is currently active: 4-1 FA.

The maple leaf in the Distinctive Unit Insignia of the 1st Field Artillery commemorates the service in Canada of some elements of the regiment during the War of 1812.

==== 4-1 FA ====
Campaigns (earned): Canada

4-1 FA originated as Captain Moses Porter's Company of Artillery of the 3rd Sublegion, Legion of the United States, organized in 1792 near Fort Wayne, Indiana. By 1804 Captain Porter's Company had become Captain Nathaniel Leonard's Company, Regiment of Artillerists, which was redesignated on January 11, 1812, as Captain Nathaniel Leonard's Company, 1st Regiment of Artillery. In early 1814 Captain Leonard's Company was consolidated with Captain Alexander S. Brooks's Company, 3rd Regiment of Artillery (constituted on January 11, 1812, as Captain James McKeon's Company, 3rd Regiment of Artillery), with the new company redesignated as Captain Alexander Brooks's Company, 3rd Regiment of Artillery. On May 12, 1814, Captain Brooks's Company was redesignated as Captain Alexander Brooks's Company, Corps of Artillery.

Credit for the Canada Campaign for 4-1 FA was earned by participation of Leonard's and Brook's Company in several actions along the Canada–US border. In its first action Leonard's Company, among the American force at Fort Niagara, was credited with sinking a British schooner at its wharf on the other side of the Niagara River while firing on Fort George on November 21–22. Leonard's Company was still at Fort Niagara a year later when the British captured the fort. Negligent leadership by Captain. Leonard, who commanded the fort at the time, is generally blamed for the relatively easy victory by the British. The company, under the command of Captain Alexander Brooks, was present at the Battle of Plattsburg, the American victory that ended the final British attempt to invade the northeastern states along the Richelieu River and Lake Champlain.

4-1 FA is currently an element in the 3rd Brigade Combat Team, 1st Armored Division.

=== 3rd Field Artillery ===
Campaigns: Canada

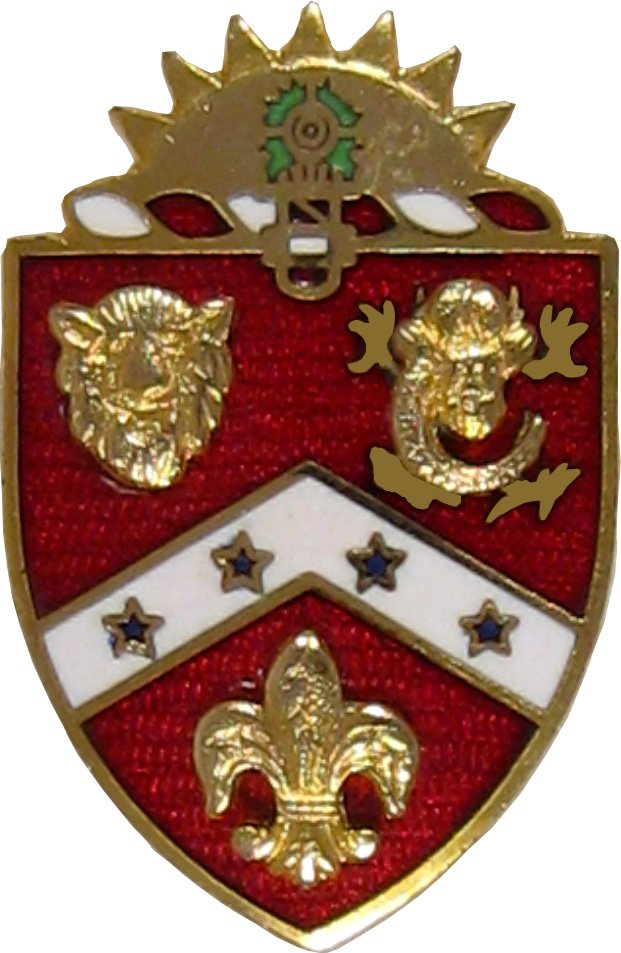
Distinctive Unit Insignia: 3 FA

The 3rd Field Artillery traces its lineage back to January 5, 1907, when the 3rd Field Artillery was organized at Fort Sam Houston, Texas, from new and existing companies. Two battalions of the 3rd Field Artillery are derived from artillery companies that served in the War of 1812: 1-3 FA, derived from Captain Samuel Dyson's Company, 1st Regiment of Artillery, originally constituted on May 9, 1794, and organized on June 30, 1794, at Governor's Island, New York, as Captain Alexander Thompson's Company, which became Captain Dyson's Company, Regiment of Artillerists in 1804; and 5-3 FA, derived from Captain Nehemiah Freeman's Company, 1st Regiment of Artillery, originally constituted on April 27, 1798, and organized in June 1798 at Alexandria, Virginia, as Captain William McRae's Company, 2nd Regiment of Artillerists and Engineers. Both 1-3 FA and 5-3 FA have credit for the Canada Campaign. Only one is currently active: 5-3 FA.

During the early phases of the war, Dyson's Company, or elements thereof, participated in Brigadier General William Hull's unsuccessful invasion of Canada and his subsequent retreat and surrender of Detroit.

The lion's face in the Distinctive Unit Insignia alludes to the participation of some of the elements of the regiment in the War of 1812.

==== 5-3 FA ====
Campaigns (earned):Canada

5-3 FA was constituted on April 27, 1798, and organized in June 1798 at Alexandria, Virginia, as Captain William McRae's Company, 2nd Regiment of Artillerists and Engineers. By 1800, Captain McRae's Company had become Captain Alexander D. Pope's Company, 4th Battalion, 2nd Regiment of Artillerists and Engineers, which was consolidated on April 1, 1802, with Captain Josiah Dunham's and Captain John Henry's Companies (both constituted April 27, 1798), with the new unit being redesignated as Captain Nehemiah Freeman's Company, Regiment of Artillerists. Captain Freeman's Company was redesignated as Captain Nehemiah Freeman's Company, 1st Regiment of Artillery on January 11, 1812, which was redesignated as Captain William Gates' Company, 1st Regiment of Artillery on August 16, 1813. Captain William Gates' Company, 1st Regiment of Artillery, was redesignated as Captain William Gates' Company, Corps of Artillery, on May 12, 1814.

Credit for the Canada Campaign was awarded to the 5-3 FA for service by Freeman's and Gates' Company in forts and garrisons along the Canada–US border.

5-3 FA is currently assigned to the 17th Fires Brigade, I Corps.

=== 5th Field Artillery ===
Campaigns: None

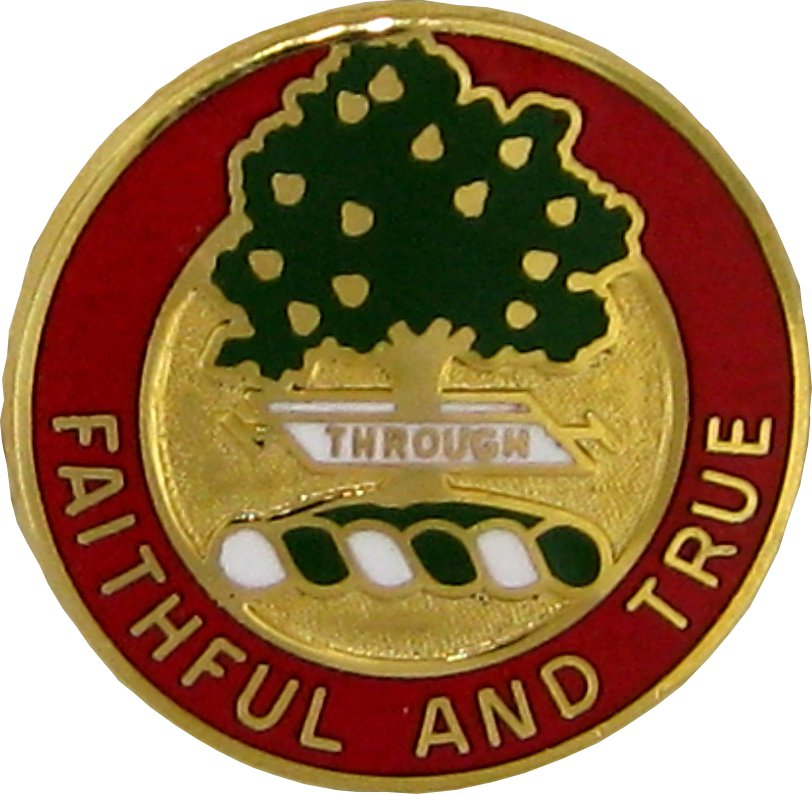
Distinctive Unit Insignia: 5 FA

The 5th Field Artillery traces its lineage back to January 25, 1907, when the 5th Field Artillery was organized at Fort Leavenworth, Kansas, from new and existing companies (less the 2nd Battalion, which was organized in the Philippine Islands). One battalion of the 5th Field Artillery, 1-5 FA, is derived from Captain Charles Wollstonecraft's Company. Wollstonecraft's Company earned credit for the Louisiana 1815 Campaign. This credit is not shared by the 5th Field Artillery Regiment, since 1-5 FA is the only battalion in the regiment with earned credit for this campaign.

==== 1-5 FA ====
Campaigns (earned): Louisiana 1814, Louisiana 1815

1-5 FA is the oldest unit in the Regular Army and the only one to have credit for participation in the Revolutionary War. The battalion traces its roots to the New York Provincial Company of Artillery, organized in 1776 and initially commanded by Captain Alexander Hamilton. From 1777 through 1784 it was referred to as Captain John Doughty's Company. After many reorganizations and redesignations, the unit became Captain John Wollstonecraft's Company, 1st Regiment of Artillery on January 11, 1812. In May 1813 Wollstonecraft's Company was redesignated as a company in the Corps of Artillery when this organization was formed by combining the 1st, 2nd and 3rd Regiments of Artillery.

Wollstonecraft's Company, along with Captain Thomas Murray's Company (refer to the section on the 4th Air Defense Artillery), was among the forces at Fort St. Philip, a fort below New Orleans about thirty miles from the mouth of the Mississippi River, that was subjected to a prolonged bombarded by British warships on January 9–18, 1815, following the unsuccessful British assault on New Orleans. This action earned credit for the Louisiana 1815 Campaign.

1-5 FA is currently active, serving as an element of the 1st Infantry Brigade Combat Team, 1st Infantry Division.

=== 6th Field Artillery ===
Campaigns: None

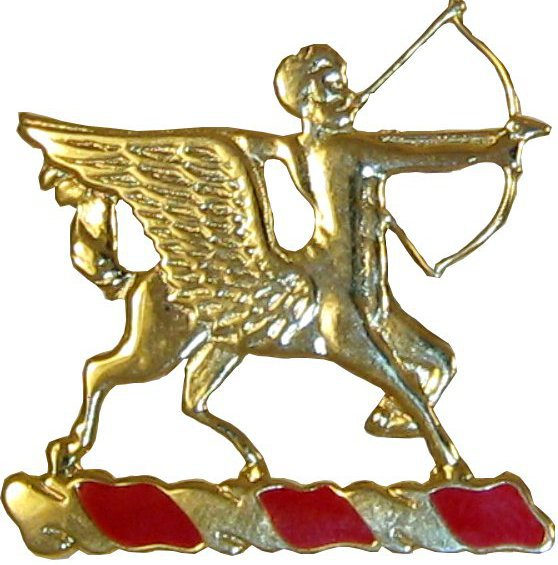
Distinctive Unit Insignia: 6 FA Right

The 6th Field Artillery was constituted on January 25, 1907, and organized from existing units at Fort Riley, Kansas. One battalion of the 6th Field Artillery, 1-6 FA, is derived from an artillery company that served in the War of 1812: Capt. Enoch Humphrey's Company.

==== 1-6 FA ====
Campaigns (earned): New Orleans

1-6 FA traces its lineage back to Captain James Stille's Company, 3rd Battalion, 2nd Regiment of Artillerists and Engineers, constituted on April 27, 1798, and organized in 1798 at Fort Jay, New York. By 1809 Captain Stille's Company had become Captain. Enoch Humphrey's Company, Regiment of Artillerists, which was redesignated as Captain Enoch Humphrey's Company, 1st Regiment of Artillery, on January 11, 1812, and then as Captain Enoch Humphrey's Company, Corps of Artillery, on May 12, 1814.

Humphrey's Company played a crucial role in the Battle of New Orleans during the climactic British assault on January 8, 1815. Humphrey's Company was positioned about seventy feet from the Mississippi River at the right terminus of Jackson's primary defense line east of the river. The devastating fire that the American artillery put down on the advancing British infantry played a decisive role in stopping the British attack.

1-6 FA is currently active, serving as an element of the 3rd Infantry Brigade Combat Team, 1st Infantry Division.

== Infantry ==
During the demobilization that occurred immediately following the war, thirteen infantry regiments were abolished, while eight new infantry regiments, numbered 1 through 8, were formed by consolidating various combinations of thirty-five of the forty-eight regiments that had existed during the war, as follows:

1st Infantry Regiment: formed by consolidation of the 2nd, 3rd, 7th and 44th Infantry Regiments;
2nd Infantry Regiment: formed by consolidation of the 6th, 16th, 22nd, 23rd and 32nd Infantry Regiments;
3rd Infantry Regiment: formed by consolidation of the 1st, 5th, 17th, 19th and 28th Infantry Regiments;
4th Infantry Regiment: formed by consolidation of the 14th, 18th, 20th, 36th and 38th Infantry Regiments;
5th Infantry Regiment: formed by consolidation of the 4th, 9th, 13th, 21st, 40th and 46th Infantry Regiments;
6th Infantry Regiment: formed by consolidation of the 11th, 25th, 27th, 29th and 37th Infantry Regiments;
7th Infantry Regiment: formed by consolidation of the 8th, 24th and 39th Infantry Regiments; and
8th Infantry Regiment: formed by consolidation of the 10th and 12th Infantry Regiments.

The new 8th Infantry was abolished soon after its formation.

The new regiments numbered 1 through 7 resulting from these consolidations still exist, and they perpetuate the lineages of thirty-three regiments that served during the War of 1812. These seven regiments are the only current infantry regiments with credit for participation in the War of 1812. It was not until 1838, in anticipation of the War with Mexico, that additional regiments were created.

Note that the numbering of the seven new infantry regiments formed during this contraction of the Army did not correspond to the numbering of the seven infantry regiments that existed before the contraction. The numerical designations of the new regiments were determined by the seniority of the commanding officers, i.e., the regiment with the most senior commanding officer was designated as the 1st Infantry, while the regiment with the next most senior colonel became the 2nd Infantry, and so on. This reorganization caused considerable consternation among many in the Army, who considered it an attack on regimental traditions. At the core of this dispute was whether the seven new regiments shared a heritage with the older regiments with the same numerical designation (the veterans of the War of 1812 felt strongly that they did), or whether a regiment's heritage followed its organizational history no matter what changes in numerical designation might have occurred (the official War Department policy).

This contradiction between sentiment and logic went unresolved, and was largely ignored, for the next fifty years, during which time the soldiers in the seven infantry regiments continued to claim a shared heritage with the earlier units with the same number, while the official policy was that heritage was defined entirely by organizational history. A resolution of this smoldering conflict was forced upon the Army in the aftermath of the Civil War, when it became official policy that regiments would display their battle histories on their colors or in the form of streamers representing participation in specific battles or campaigns. Infantry regiments numbering 1–7, in direct violation of War Department policy, proudly claimed credit for campaigns earned by the older regiments with the same numerical designation. Finally, in 1896, the War Department yielded to sentiment and ordered that the new regiments formed in 1815 could claim credit for campaigns awarded to earlier regiments with the same number.

But the last word had not yet been spoken, and during the 1920s there was a series of reversals of policy and reversals of reversals. In 1920 the War Department reversed the 1896 policy, issuing a ruling that forbade existing regiments from claiming credit for campaigns earned by earlier units on the basis numerical designation and denying any historical linkage between units based upon numerical designation. Needless to say, this announcement caused great anguish among the soldiers in the regiments. The official edict is reproduced below in full.

II. Rules for tracing history of units (Cir. No. 80, W. D., 1920). – It has come to the attention of the War Department that there is some divergence of understanding in regard to the method of tracing the history of troop units. To settle the practice, the following rule is announced for the guidance of all concerned: The numerical designation of a troop unit does not in itself entitle that unit to inherit the history of any previous unit having that number; the organization itself will be traced through its changes, regardless of number.

But in 1923 the War Department issued a new policy that totally reversed the policy of 1920. According to this announcement, not only would the regiments formed in 1815 be allowed to claim campaign credits earned by the earlier units with the same number, but it also asserted that historical continuity between units could be claimed solely on the basis of identical numerical designations.

IV. History of certain regiments. – In the application of the principles stated in Section II, Bulletin No. 13, War Department, 1920 (Rules for tracing history of units), the records of the 1st, 2nd, 3rd, 4th, 5th, 6th and 7th Regiments of Infantry up to and including the reorganization of the Army in 1815 substantially as approved by the Secretary of War, October 30, 1896, and published in the Army Register from 1897 to 1912, will not be disturbed. The history of those seven regiments prior to 1816 will be credited in accordance with similarity of numerical designations, and will not be considered to have passed to another regiment because of the "muster for selection" incident to the reorganization of 1815; however, battle honors that may have been awarded to any one of the first seven regiments of Infantry because of the reorganization in 1815 will not have to be withdrawn.

In 1926, the 1923 policy was rescinded, and yet a new revised set of rules for determining both the lineage and the honors for the current 1st-through-7th Infantry Regiments was established. This policy was a compromise, and in common with so many compromises it really isn't logically consistent but has the virtue of satisfying both parties in the dispute. According to this edict, lineages were to be determined strictly according to accepted genealogical principles: lineages would follow organizational changes and redesignations, regardless of numerical designations. But the current 1st through 7th Infantry Regiments would be allowed to claim battle honors earned by the earlier infantry regiments having the same number: the powerful feelings of members of the new regiments of a shared heritage with their counterparts in older regiments with the same number were recognized and officially enshrined.

I. History of certain regiments. – Section IV, Bulletin No. 8, War Department, 1923, relating to the foregoing subject is rescinded; but battle honors that may have been awarded to any of the first seven regiments of Infantry in compliance with the provisions thereof will not be now withdrawn.

An interesting reflection of this dispute will be described in more detail in the discussion of the Distinctive Unit Insignia of the 7th Infantry Regiment, in which the DUI commemorates events in the histories of the old 7th Infantry Regiment, which is not in the lineages of the current 7th Infantry.

=== 1st Infantry ===
Campaigns: Canada, Lundy's Lane, New Orleans, Alabama 1814, Florida 1814, Alabama 1815, Louisiana 1815

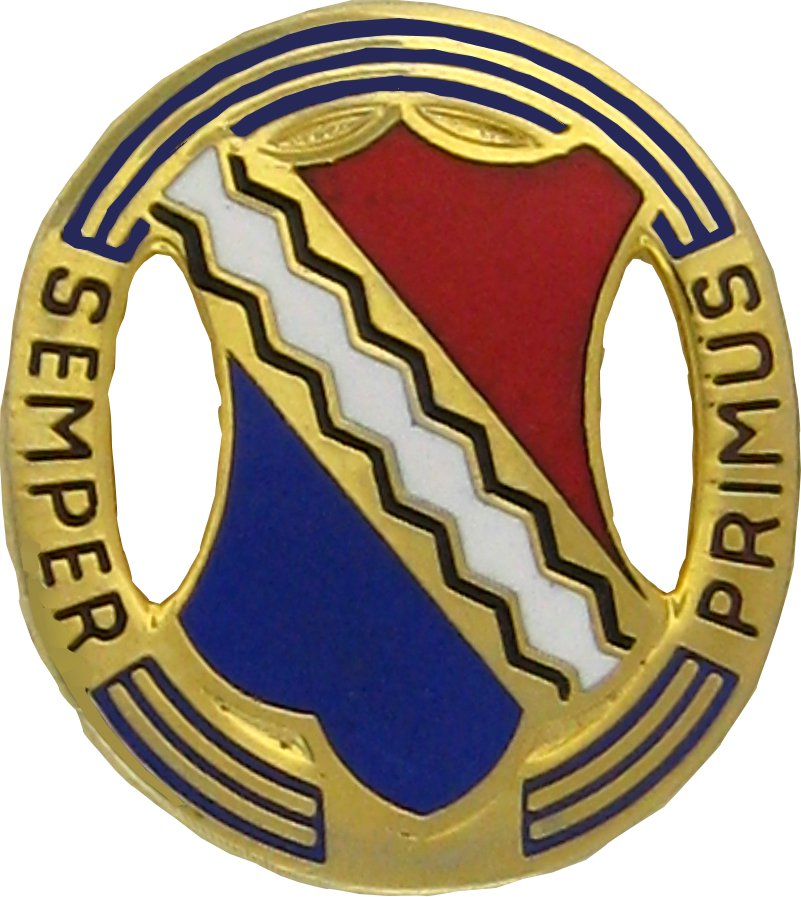
Distinctive Unit Insignia: 1 Inf

The 1st Infantry was constituted on March 3, 1791, as the 2nd Infantry and organized in New England. It was redesignated in 1792 as the 2nd Sub-Legion and on October 31, 1796, as the 2nd Infantry. The 2nd Infantry was consolidated during May–October, 1815, with the 3rd and 7th Infantry (both constituted on April 12, 1808) and the 44th Infantry (constituted on January 29, 1813) to form the new 1st Infantry.

Actions of the old 2nd, 3rd, 7th and 44th Infantry during the War of 1812

2nd Infantry: 1814, Fort Bowyer; 1815, Fort Bowyer;
3rd Infantry: 1813, Econochaca (Creek War); 1814, Pensacola;
7th Infantry: 1812, Fort Harrison, Lake Peoria Expedition; 1814, Prairie du Chien, Rock River, Villeré's Plantation; 1815, New Orleans, Fort St. Philip; and
44th Infantry: 1814, Pensacola, Villeré's Plantation; 1815, New Orleans.

Two active battalions of the present-day 1st Infantry are derived from companies of the old 2nd, 3rd, 7th and 44th Infantry Regiments: 1-1 Inf and 2-1 Inf.

==== 1-1 Inf ====
Campaigns (earned): Alabama 1815

The 1st Battalion, 1st Infantry traces its origin to a company in the 2nd Infantry constituted on March 3, 1791, and organized in New England. This company was redesignated as a company in the Infantry of the 2nd Sub-Legion in 1792, and then redesignated again on October 31, 1796, as a company of the 2nd Infantry. During May–October 1815, it was consolidated with a companies of the 3rd and 7th Infantry Regiments (both constituted on April 12, 1808) and a company of the 44th Infantry (constituted on January 29, 1813) to form a company in the new 1st Infantry. On April 21, 1816, it was designated as Company A, 1st Infantry. Company A underwent a number of redesignations during the twentieth century, becoming the 1st Battalion, 1st Infantry on December 31, 1964.

1-1 Inf is currently stationed at the U. S. Military Academy at West Point, where it provides forces, equipment, services, and security in order to facilitate the mission of the U. S. Military Academy.

==== 2-1 Inf ====
Campaigns (earned): New Orleans, Alabama 1814, Florida 1814, Louisiana 1815

The 2nd Battalion, 1st Infantry traces its origin to a company in the 2nd Infantry constituted on March 3, 1791, and organized in New England. This company was redesignated as a company in the Infantry of the 2nd Sub-Legion in 1792, and redesignated again on October 31, 1796, as a company of the 2nd Infantry. During May–October 1815, it was consolidated with a companies of the 3rd and 7th Infantry Regiments (both constituted on April 12, 1808) and a company of the 44th Infantry (constituted on January 29, 1813) to form a company in the new 1st Infantry. On April 21, 1816, it was designated as Company B, 1st Infantry. Company B underwent a number of redesignations during the twentieth century, becoming the 2nd Battalion, 1st Infantry on September 15, 1965.

2-1 Inf is currently an element of the 2nd Brigade Combat Team, 2nd Infantry Division.

=== 2nd Infantry ===
Campaigns: Canada, Chippewa, Lundy's Lane, Alabama 1814

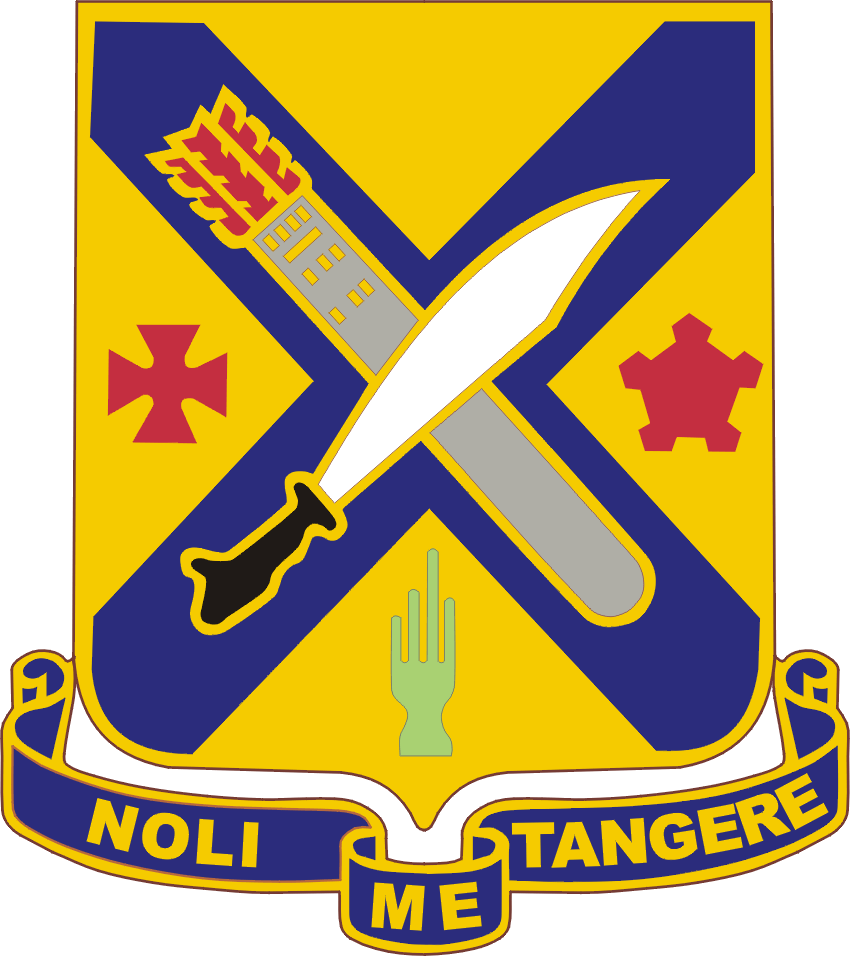
Distinctive Unit Insignia: 2 Inf

The 2nd Infantry was constituted on April 12, 1808, as the 6th Infantry and organized in Pennsylvania, New York and New Jersey. The 6th Infantry was consolidated during May–October, 1815, with the 16th Infantry (constituted on January 11, 1812), the 22nd and 23rd Infantry (both constituted on June 26, 1812), and the 32nd Infantry (constituted on January 29, 1813) to form the new 2nd Infantry. On October 1, 2005, the 2nd Infantry was redesignated as the 2nd Infantry Regiment.

Actions of the old 6th, 16th 22nd, 23rd and 32nd Infantry during the War of 1812

6th Infantry: 1812, Queenston Heights; 1813, York, Fort George, Beaver Dams, French Creek; 1814, La Colle Mill, Plattsburg;
16th Infantry: 1813, York, Stoney Creek, Crysler's Farm; 1814, Cook's Mills;
22nd Infantry: 1812, Fort Niagara; 1813, Fort George, French Creek, Crysler's Farm; 1814, Chippewa, Lundy's Lane, Fort Erie;
23rd Infantry: 1812, Queenston Heights, Frenchman's Creek; 1813, Fort George, Sackett's Harbor, Stoney Creek, Beaver Dams; 1814, Chippewa, Lundy's Lane, Fort Erie; and
32nd Infantry: Not engaged.

Two active battalions of the present-day 2nd Infantry are derived from companies of the old 6th, 16th, 22nd, 23rd and 32nd Infantry Regiments: 1-2 Inf and 2-2 Inf.

==== 1-2 Inf ====
Campaigns (earned): Canada, Chippewa, Lundy's Lane

The 1st Battalion, 2nd Infantry traces its origin to a company in the 6th Infantry constituted on April 12, 1808, and organized in Pennsylvania, New York, or New Jersey. During May–October 1815, it was consolidated with a company of the 16th Infantry (constituted January 11, 1812), a company each of the 22nd and 23rd Infantry (both constituted on June 26, 1812), and a company of the 32nd Infantry (constituted on January 29, 1813) to form a company in the new 2nd Infantry. On May 22, 1816, it was designated as Company A, 2nd Infantry. On May 22, 1816, it was designated as Company A, 2nd Infantry. Company A underwent a number of redesignations during the twentieth century, becoming the 1st Battalion, 2nd Infantry on October 1, 2005.

1-2 Inf is currently an element of the 172nd Infantry Brigade (Separate).

==== 2-2 Inf ====
Campaigns (earned): Canada, Chippewa, Lundy's Lane

The 2nd Battalion, 2nd Infantry traces its origin to a company in the 6th Infantry constituted on April 12, 1808, and organized in Pennsylvania, New York, or New Jersey. During May–October 1815, it was consolidated with a company of the 16th Infantry (constituted January 11, 1812), a company each of the 22nd and 23rd Infantry (both constituted on June 26, 1812), and a company of the 32nd Infantry (constituted on January 29, 1813) to form a company in the new 2nd Infantry. On May 22, 1816, it was designated as Company B, 2nd Infantry. On May 22, 1816, it was designated as Company A, 2nd Infantry. On May 22, 1816, it was designated as Company B, 2nd Infantry. Company B underwent a number of redesignations during the twentieth century, becoming the 2nd Battalion, 2nd Infantry on October 1, 2005.

2-2 Inf is currently an element of the 3rd Brigade Combat Team, 1st Infantry Division.

=== 3rd Infantry (The Old Guard) ===
Campaigns: Canada, Chippewa, Lundy's Lane

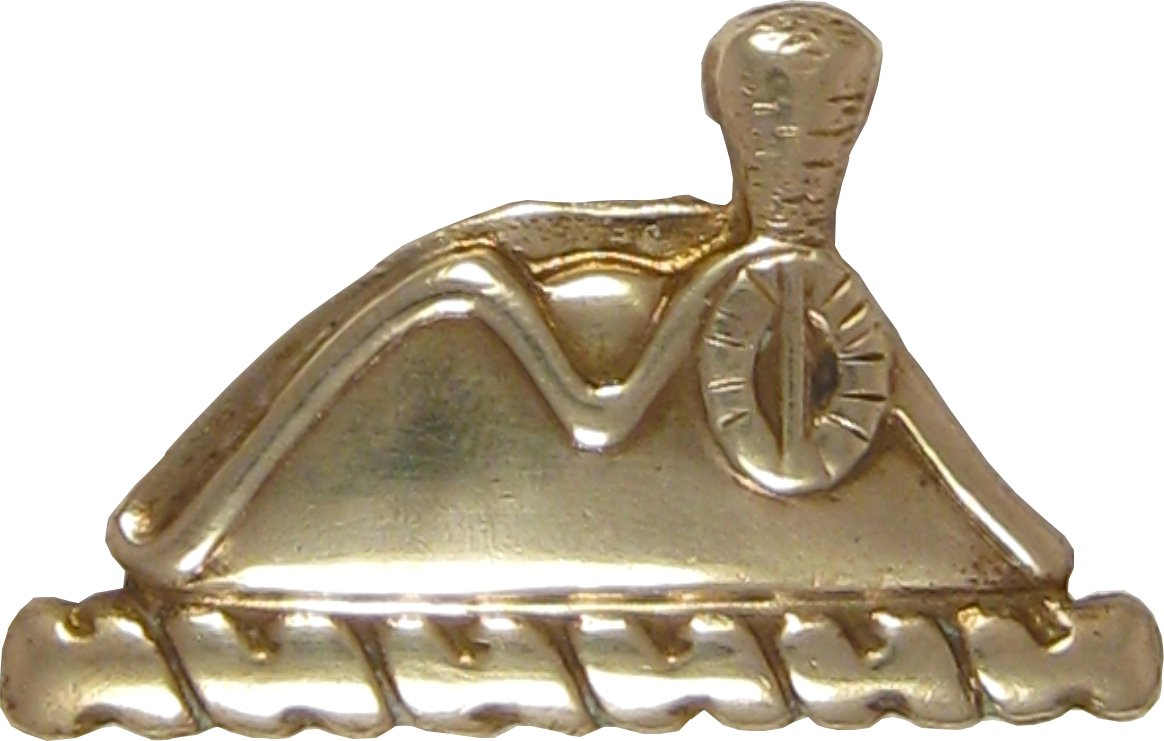
Distinctive Unit Insignia: 3 Inf

The 3rd Infantry is the oldest infantry regiment in the Regular Army. It was constituted on June 3, 1784, as the First American Regiment and organized in August–September 1784 in Pennsylvania and New Jersey. Addition companies were organized in New York and Connecticut in 1785. It was redesignated in 1789 as the Regiment of Infantry, in 1791 as the 1st Infantry, in 1792 as the Infantry of the 1st Sub-Legion, and on October 31, 1796, as the 1st Infantry. The 1st Infantry was consolidated during May–October, 1815, with the 5th Infantry (constituted April 12, 1808), the 17th Infantry (constituted January 11, 1812), the 19th Infantry (constituted on June 26, 1812) and the 28th Infantry (constituted January 29, 1813) to form the new 3rd Infantry.

Actions of the old 1st, 5th, 17th, 19th and 28th Infantry during the War of 1812

1st Infantry: 1812, Maguaga (det.), Fort Dearborn (det.), Detroit (det.), Fort Wayne (det.); 1813, Fort Madison (det.); 1814, Campbell's Island (det.), Lundy's Lane, Fort Erie;
5th Infantry: 1813, Stoney Creek, French Creek, Chateauguay; 1814, La Colle Mill, Chippewa River, Cook's Mills;
17th Infantry: 1813, Frenchtown, Fort Meigs, Fort Stephenson; 1814, Mackinac;
19th Infantry: 1812, Detroit (det.), Mississinewa (det.); 1813, Frenchtown (det.), Fort Meigs, Fort Niagara (det.); 1814, Chippewa (det.), Lundy's Lane (det.), Fort Erie, Mackinac (det.); and
28th Infantry: 1813, Detachment serving as marines during the Battle of Lake Erie; 1814, Longwoods, Sturgeon Creek.

Three active battalions of the present-day 3rd Infantry are derived from companies of the old 1st, 5th, 17th, 19th and 28th Infantry Regiments: 1-3 Inf, 2-3 Inf and 4-3 Inf.

==== 1-3 Inf ====
Campaigns (earned): Canada, Chippewa, Lundy's Lane

1-3 Inf traces its origin to a company in the First American Regiment constituted on June 3, 1784, and organized by September in Pennsylvania or New Jersey. The company underwent a series of reorganizations between 1789 and 1792, eventually becoming a company of the 1st Infantry in 1796. During May–October 1815, it was consolidated with a company of the 5th Infantry (constituted April 12, 1808), a company of the 17th Infantry (constituted January 11, 1812), a company of the 19th Infantry (constituted June 26, 1812), and a company of the 28th Infantry (constituted January 29, 1813) to form a company of the 3rd Infantry. On April 21, 1816, it was designated as Company A, 3rd Infantry. Company A, 3rd Infantry underwent a number of redesignations during the twentieth century, becoming the 1st Battalion, 3rd Infantry on December 20, 1963.

1-3 and 4-3 Inf perform numerous ceremonial duties in the National Capital Region. 1-3 Inf performs military funerals at Arlington National Cemetery and casket transfers at Dover Air Force Base. The battalion also include a Salute Guns Platoon that is responsible for rendering honors to visiting foreign dignitaries and heads of state at the White House, the Pentagon and elsewhere in the Washington D.C., area. On order, 1-3 Inf conducts defense support of civil authorities and deploys elements in support of overseas contingency operations.

==== 2-3 Inf ====
Campaigns (earned): Canada, Chippewa, Lundy's Lane

2-3 Inf traces its origin to a company in the First American Regiment constituted on June 3, 1784, and organized by September in Pennsylvania or New Jersey. Following a series of reorganizations between 1789 and 1792, this company became a company of the 1st Infantry in 1796. During the contraction of the Army that followed the war, in May–October 1815 it was consolidated with a company of the 5th Infantry (constituted April 12, 1808), a company of the 17th Infantry (constituted January 11, 1812), a company of the 19th Infantry (constituted June 26, 1812), and a company of the 28th Infantry (constituted January 29, 1813) to form a company of the 3rd Infantry. On May 22, 1816, it was designated as Company B, 3rd Infantry. Company B, 1st Infantry underwent a number of redesignations during the twentieth century, becoming the 2nd Battalion, 3rd Infantry on December 20, 1963.

2-3 Inf is currently an element of the 3rd Brigade Combat Team, 2nd Infantry Division.

==== 4-3 Inf ====
Campaigns (earned): Canada, Chippewa, Lundy's Lane

4-3 Inf traces its origin to a company in the First American Regiment constituted on June 3, 1784, and organized by September in Pennsylvania or New Jersey. Following a series of reorganizations between 1789 and 1792, this company became a company of the 1st Infantry in 1796. During May–October 1815 it was consolidated with a company of the 5th Infantry (constituted April 12, 1808), a company of the 17th Infantry (constituted January 11, 1812), a company of the 19th Infantry (constituted June 26, 1812), and a company of the 28th Infantry (constituted January 29, 1813) to form a company of the 3rd Infantry. On May 22, 1816, it was designated as Company D, 3rd Infantry. Company D, 3rd Infantry underwent a number of redesignations during the twentieth century, becoming the 4th Battalion, 3rd Infantry on October 16, 2005.

Like 1-3 Inf, 4-3 Inf is a ceremonial unit located in the National Capital Area. It includes a platoon that guards the Tomb of the Unknown Soldier, a Caisson Platoon, the Commander-in-Chief's Guard, an Honor Guard, the Army Drill Team, the Old Guard Fife and Drum Corps and the U. S. Army Drill Team. On order, 4-3 Inf conducts defense support of civil authorities in the National Capital Region.

=== 4th Infantry ===
Campaigns: Canada, Bladensburg, McHenry

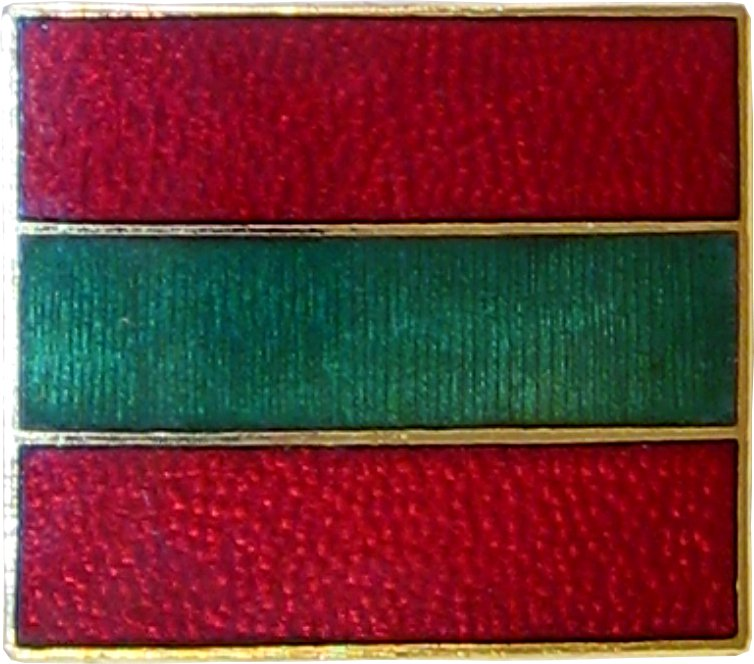
Distinctive Unit Insignia: 4 Inf

The 4th Infantry was constituted on January 11, 1812, as the 14th Infantry and organized in Virginia, Maryland, Delaware and Pennsylvania in March 1812. The 14th Infantry was consolidated during May–October, 1815, with the 18th and 20th Infantry (both constituted on January 11, 1812) and the 36th and 38th Infantry (both constituted on January 29, 1813) to form the new 4th Infantry.

Actions of the old 14th, 18th, 20th, 36th and 38th Infantry during the War of 1812

14th Infantry: 1812, Fort Niagara, Frenchman's Creek; 1813, Fort George, Beaver Dams, Crysler's Farm; 1814, La Colle Mill, Cook's Mills;
18th Infantry: Deployed at Charleston, South Carolina, but not engaged;
20th Infantry: 1812, Frenchman's Creek; 1813, Fort George, Craney Island; 1814, La Colle Mill;
36th Infantry: 1814, St. Leonard's Creek, Bladensburg, McHenry; and
38th Infantry: 1814, St. Leonard's Creek, Bladensburg, McHenry.

Three active battalions of the present-day 4th Infantry are derived from companies of the old 14th, 18th, 20th, 36th and 38th Infantry Regiments: 1-4 Inf, 2-4 Inf and 3-4 Inf.

==== 1-4 Inf ====
Campaigns (earned): Canada, Bladensburg, McHenry

The 1st Battalion, 4th Infantry traces its origin to a company in the 14th Infantry constituted on January 11, 1812, and organized in Pennsylvania in 1812. During May–October 1815, it was consolidated with a company each of the 18th and 20th Infantry (both constituted January 11, 1812), a company each of the 36th and 38th Infantry (both constituted on January 29, 1813) to form a company in the new 4th Infantry. On August 21, 1816, it was designated as Company A, 4th Infantry. Company A, 4th Infantry became the 1st Battalion, 4th Infantry on April 18, 1963.

1-4 Inf is currently an element in the 7th Army Joint Multinational Training Command, Joint Multinational Readiness Center, located in Hohenfels, Germany.

==== 2-4 Inf ====
Campaigns (earned): Canada, Bladensburg, McHenry

The 2nd Battalion, 4th Infantry traces its origin to a company in the 14th Infantry constituted on January 11, 1812, and organized in March, 1812. During May–October 1815, it was consolidated with a company each of the 18th and 20th Infantry (both constituted January 11, 1812), a company each of the 36th and 38th Infantry (both constituted on January 29, 1813) to form a company in the new 4th Infantry. On August 21, 1816, it was designated as Company B, 4th Infantry. Company B, 4th Infantry became the 2nd Battalion, 4th Infantry on July 21, 1969.

2-4 Inf is currently an element in the 4th Brigade Combat Team, 10th Mountain Division.

==== 3-4 Inf ====
Campaigns (earned) Canada, Bladensburg, McHenry

The 3rd Battalion, 4th Infantry traces its origin to a company in the 14th Infantry constituted on January 11, 1812, and organized in 1812. During May–October 1815, it was consolidated with a company each of the 18th and 20th Infantry (both constituted January 11, 1812), a company each of the 36th and 38th Infantry (both constituted on January 29, 1813) to form a company in the new 4th Infantry. On August 21, 1816, it was designated as Company C, 4th Infantry. Company B, 4th Infantry became the 3rd Battalion, 4th Infantry on April 1, 1963.

3-4 Inf is currently an element in the 170th Infantry Brigade, stationed in Baumholder, Germany.

=== 5th Infantry ===
Campaigns: Canada, Chippewa, Lundy's Lane

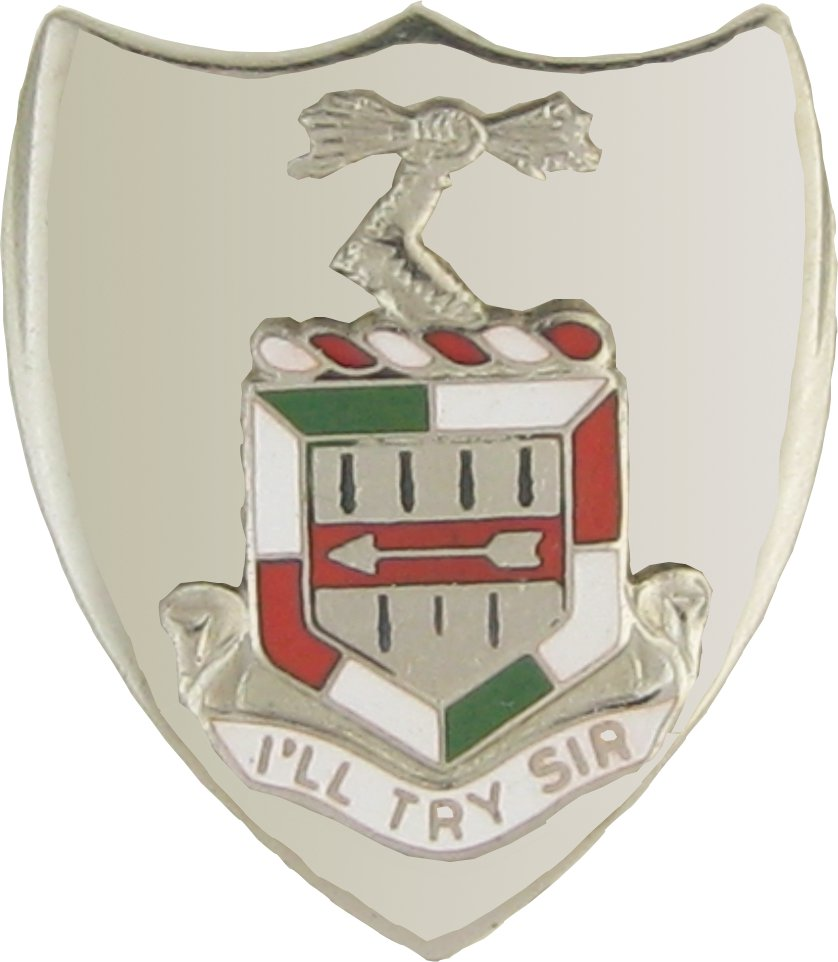
Distinctive Unit Insignia: 5 Inf

The 5th Infantry was constituted on April 12, 1808, as the 4th Infantry and organized in New England May–June 1808. The 4th Infantry was consolidated during May–October 1815, with the 9th and 13th Infantry (both constituted on January 11, 1812), the 21st Infantry (constituted on June 26, 1812), the 40th Infantry (constituted January 29, 1813), and the 46th Infantry (constituted March 30, 1814) to form the 5th Infantry.

Actions of the old 14th, 18th, 20th, 36th and 38th Infantry during the War of 1812

4th Infantry: 1812, Brownstown, Detroit; 1813, Chateauguay, French Creek, Champlain Village;
9th Infantry.: 1813, Sackett's Harbor, Crysler's Farm; 1814, Chippewa, Lundy's Lane, Fort Erie;
13th Infantry: 1812, Queenston Heights, Frenchman's Creek; 1813, Fort George, Crysler's Farm; 1814, LaColle Mill, Plattsburg;
21st Infantry: 1813, York, Fort George, Sackett's Harbor, Crysler's Farm; 1814, Chippewa, Lundy's Lane, Fort Erie;
40th Infantry: 1814, Fort Sullivan (Eastport, Maine); and
46th Infantry: Garrisoned in the New York City area, but not engaged.

The 4th Infantry, commanded by Gov. William Henry Harrison, was also present at the Battle of Tippecanoe on November 7, 1811.

The motto inscribed on the Distinctive Unit Insignia of the 5th Infantry, "I'll Try Sir," is attributed to Colonel James Miller, the commander of the 21st Infantry, when asked if he could take a British battery of seven cannons that commanded the battlefield at Lundy's Lane. He succeeded and then held firm against several counterattacks by British infantry. The seven cannons are also represented in the insignia. The red fess (the horizontal band along the center third of the shield) with an arrow commemorates the Battle of Tippecanoe.

Two active battalions of the present-day 5th Infantry are derived from companies of the old 4th, 9th, 13th, 21st, 40th and 46th Infantry Regiments: 1-5 and 2-5 Inf.

==== 1-5 Inf ====
Campaigns (earned): Canada, Chippewa, Lundy's Lane

The 1st Battalion, 5th Infantry traces its origin to a company in the 4th Infantry constituted on April 12, 1808, and organized in May or June, 1808. During May–October 1815, it was consolidated with a company each of the 9th and 13th Infantry (both constituted January 11, 1812), a company of the 21st Infantry (constituted June 26, 1812), a company of the 40th Infantry (constituted January 29, 1813), and a company of the 46th Infantry (constituted March 30, 1814) to form a company of the 5th Infantry. On May 22, 1816, it was designated as Company A, 5th Infantry. Company A, 5th Infantry became the 1st Battalion, 5th Infantry on April 12, 1963.

1-5 Inf is currently an element in the 1st Brigade Combat Team, 25th Infantry Division.

==== 2-5 Inf ====
Campaigns (earned): Canada, Chippewa, Lundy's Lane

The 2nd Battalion, 5th Infantry traces its origin to a company in the 4th Infantry constituted on April 12, 1808, and organized in May or June, 1808, in New England. During May–October 1815, it was consolidated with a company each of the 9th and 13th Infantry (both constituted January 11, 1812), a company of the 21st Infantry (constituted June 26, 1812), a company of the 40th Infantry (constituted January 29, 1813), and a company of the 46th Infantry (constituted March 30, 1814) to form a company of the 5th Infantry. On May 22, 1816, it was designated as Company B, 5th Infantry. Company A, 5th Infantry became the 2nd Battalion, 5th Infantry on December 6, 199.

2-5 Inf is currently an element in the 3rd Brigade Combat Team, 1st Armored Division.

=== 6th Infantry (The Regulars) ===
Campaigns: Canada, Chippewa, Lundy's Lane

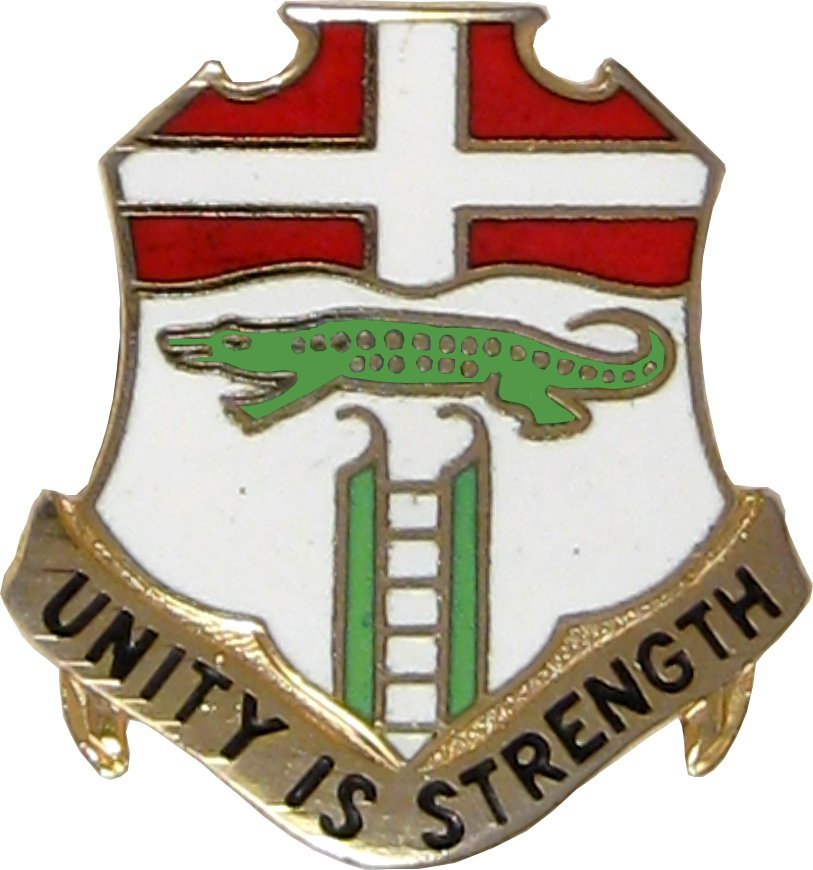
Distinctive Unit Insignia: 6 Inf

The 6th Infantry was constituted on January 11, 1812, as the 11th Infantry and organized in Vermont, New Hampshire and Connecticut during March–May 1812. The 11th Infantry was consolidated during May–October 1815, with the 25th Infantry (constituted June 26, 1812) and the 27th, 29th, and 37th Infantry (all constituted January 29, 1813) to form the 6th Infantry.

Actions of the old 11th, 25th, 27th, 29th and 37th Infantry during the War of 1812

11th Infantry: 1813, Crysler's Farm; 1814, La Colle Mill, Chippewa, Lundy's Lane, Fort Erie;
25th Infantry: 1813, Stoney Creek, Chateauguay, Crysler's Farm; 1814, Chippewa, Lundy's Lane, Fort Erie;
27th Infantry: 1813, Chatham, Thames; 1814, Longwoods;
29th Infantry: 1813, Chateauguay; 1814, Plattsburg; and
37th Infantry: Garrisoned at New London, Connecticut, but was not engaged.

It was at the Battle of Chippewa, when Brigadier General Winfield Scott was moving his troops onto the field of battle in a line that contained the 11th and 25th Infantry Regiments' that the British Commander, Major. General. Phineus Riall, is alleged to have exclaimed, "Those are regulars, by God." The nickname of the 11th Infantry, "The Regulars," is derived from this legend.

Three battalions in the 6th Infantry are derived from companies in the old 11th, 25th, 27th, 29th and 37th Infantry: 1-6, 2-6 and 4-6 Inf.

==== 1-6 Inf ====
Campaigns (earned): Canada, Chippewa, Lundy's Lane

The 1st Battalion, 6th Infantry traces its origin to a company in the 11th Infantry constituted on January 11, 1812, and organized March–May, 1812, in Vermont, New Hampshire or Connecticut. During May–October 1815, it was consolidated with a company of the 25th Infantry (constituted 26 June 1812) and a company each of the 27th, 29th, and 37th Infantry (all constituted 29 January 1813) to form a company of the 6th Infantry On May 22, 1816, it was designated as Company A, 6th Infantry. Company A, 6th Infantry became the 1st Battalion, 6th Infantry on February 3, 1962.

1-6 Inf is currently an element in the 2nd Heavy Brigade Combat Team, 1st Armored Division.

==== 2-6 Inf ====
Campaigns (earned): Canada, Chippewa, Lundy's Lane

The 2nd Battalion, 6th Infantry traces its origin to a company in the 11th Infantry constituted on January 11, 1812, and organized March–May 1812, in Vermont, New Hampshire or Connecticut. During May–October 1815, it was consolidated with a company of the 25th Infantry (constituted 26 June 1812) and a company each of the 27th, 29th, and 37th Infantry (all constituted 29 January 1813) to form a company of the 6th Infantry On May 22, 1816, it was designated as Company B, 6th Infantry. Company B, 6th Infantry became the 2nd Battalion, 6th Infantry on September 1, 1962.

Until recently 2-6 Inf was an element of the 2nd Brigade Combat Team, 1st Armored Division, but the 2nd BCT is currently being reorganized, and the assignment of the 2-6 Inf may change.

==== 4-6 Inf ====
Campaigns (earned): Canada, Chippewa, Lundy's Lane

The 4th Battalion, 6th Infantry traces its origin to a company in the 11th Infantry constituted on January 11, 1812, and organized March–May 1812, in Vermont, New Hampshire or Connecticut. During May–October 1815, it was consolidated with a company of the 25th Infantry (constituted 26 June 1812) and a company each of the 27th, 29th, and 37th Infantry (all constituted 29 January 1813) to form a company of the 6th Infantry On May 22, 1816, it was designated as Company D, 6th Infantry. Company D, 6th Infantry became the 4th Battalion, 6th Infantry on April 1, 1963.

4-6 Inf is currently an element in the 4th Heavy Brigade Combat Team, 1st Armored Division.

=== 7th Infantry (Cottonbalers) ===
Campaigns: Canada, New Orleans, Florida 1814, Louisiana 1815

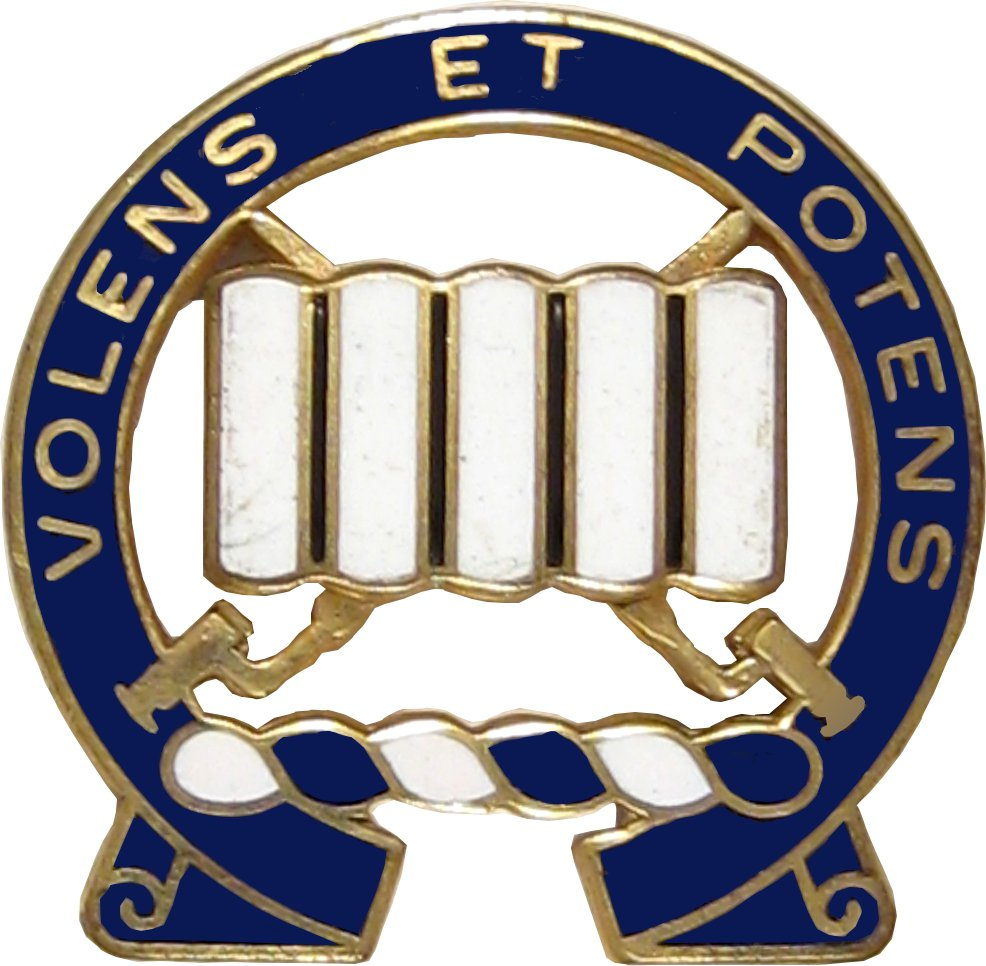
Distinctive Unit Insignia: 7 Inf

The 7th Infantry was constituted on April 12, 1808, as the 8th Infantry and organized in 1812 in Tennessee, Georgia and adjacent territories. The 8th Infantry was consolidated during May–October, 1815, with the 24th Infantry (constituted June 26, 1812) and the 39th Infantry (constituted January 29, 1813) to form the 7th Infantry.

Actions of the old 8th, 24th and 39th Infantry during the War of 1812

8th Infantry: Garrisoned at Beaufort, South Carolina, and Savannah, Georgia, but never engaged in combat;
24th Infantry: 1813, Fort Meigs (det.), Fort Stephenson (det.), Fort Niagara (det.); 1814, Longwoods (det.), Mackinac; and
39th Infantry: 1814, Horseshoe Bend (Creek War), Pensacola.

The Distinctive Unit Insignia of the 7th Infantry, which consists of a cotton bale superimposed on two crossed bayonets, commemorates the role of the old 7th Infantry in the American victory at the Battle of New Orleans. The symbolism of the cotton bale derives from the fact that cotton bales, covered with mud, were sometimes incorporated into the defensive works behind which soldiers were positioned. But the old 7th Infantry is not in the lineage of the current 7th Infantry. In fact, none of the infantry regiments that were combined in 1815 to form the new 7th Infantry served at New Orleans. The old 7th Infantry is in the lineage of the current 1st Infantry. Indeed, the actions of the old 7th Infantry are noted in the section on the 1st Infantry above. The combined effects of the War Department Bulletins of June 11, 1923, and September 30, 1929, was to affirm that both the current 1st and 7th Infantry Regiments are entitled to claim credit for the campaigns earned by the old 7th Infantry during the War of 1812.

Two battalions in the 7th Infantry are derived from companies in the old 8th, 24th and 39th Infantry: 2-7 and 3-7 Inf.

==== 2-7 Inf ====
Campaigns (earned): Canada, Florida 1814

The 2nd Battalion, 7th Infantry traces its origin to a company in the 8th Infantry constituted on January 11, 1812, and organized in 1812 in Tennessee, Georgia and the adjacent territories. During May–October 1815, it was consolidated with a company of the 24th Infantry (constituted June 26, 1812) and a company of the 39th Infantry (constituted January 29, 1813) to form a company of the 7th Infantry. On August 21, 1816, it was designated as Company B, 7th Infantry. Company B, 7th Infantry became the 2nd Battalion, 7th Infantry on April 18, 1963.

2-7 Inf is currently an element of the 1st Brigade Combat Team, 3rd Infantry Division.

==== 3-7 Inf ====
Campaigns (earned): Canada, Florida 1814

The 3rd Battalion, 7th Infantry traces its origin to a company in the 8th Infantry constituted on January 11, 1812, and organized in 1812 in Tennessee, Georgia and the adjacent territories. During May–October 1815, it was consolidated with a company of the 24th Infantry (constituted June 26, 1812) and a company of the 39th Infantry (constituted January 29, 1813) to form a company of the 7th Infantry. On August 21, 1816, it was designated as Company C, 7th Infantry. Company C, 7th Infantry became the 3rd Battalion, 7th Infantry on March 23, 1966.

3-7 Inf is currently an element of the 4th Brigade Combat Team, 3rd Infantry Division.

== See also ==
- List of Army National Guard units with campaign credit for the War of 1812
- List of United States Army units with colonial roots
- Early U.S. Artillery formations
