= Richard Smith (soldier) =

Sergeant Richard Smith
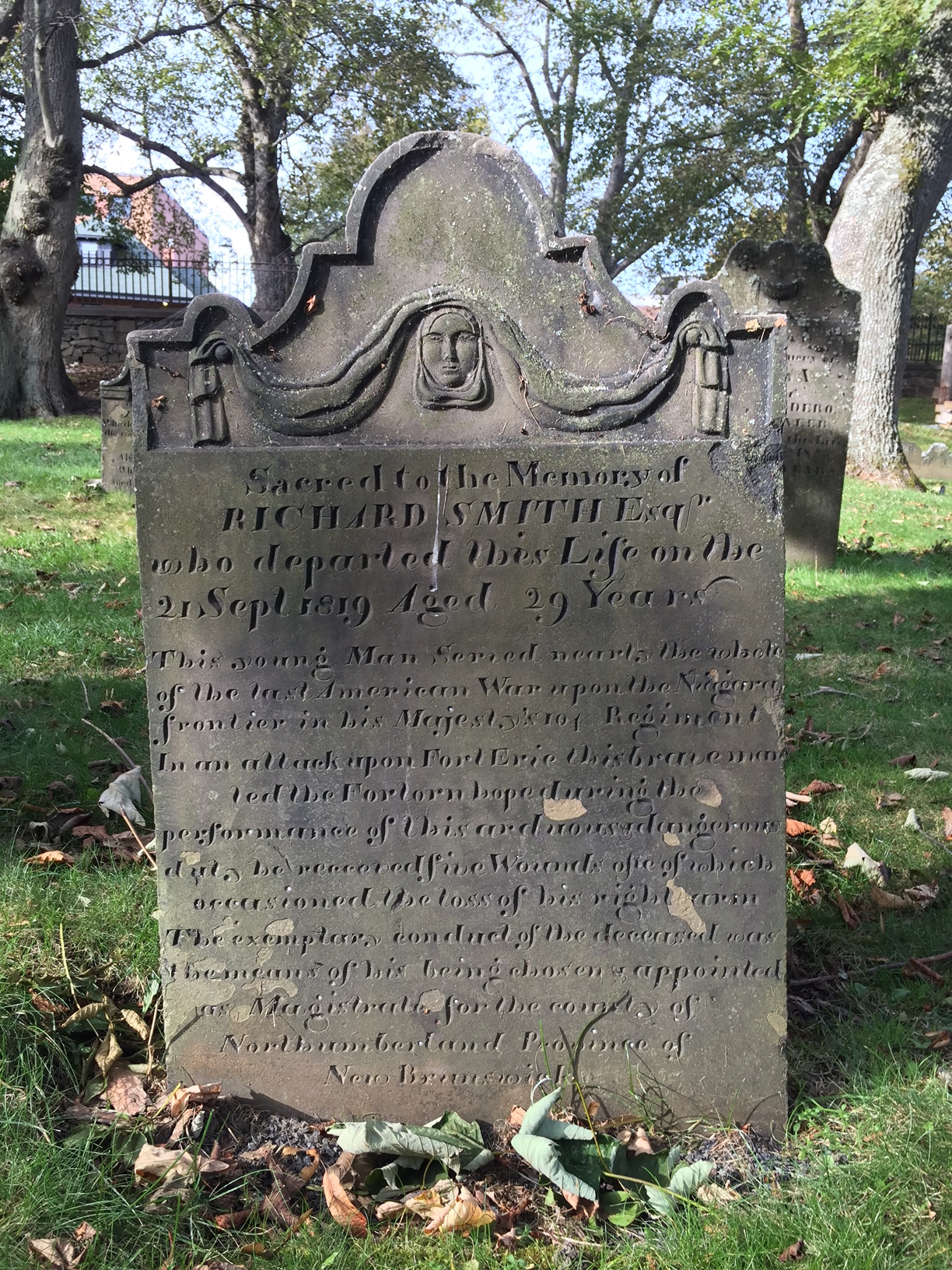
- Gravestone of Richard Smith
- Born: c. 1790; New Brunswick, Canada (supposed)
- Died: September 21, 1819 (aged 29); Halifax, Nova Scotia
- Burial place: Old Burying Ground, Halifax, Nova Scotia; 44.64°N 63.57°W
- Military career
- Allegiance: United Kingdom
- Service years: 1805-1817
- Rank: Sergeant
- Unit: 104th (New Brunswick) Regiment of Foot
- Conflicts: War of 1812

Richard Smith was a Canadian soldier who fought in the War of 1812 for the 104th (New Brunswick) Regiment of Foot.

== Early years ==
The place and date of birth of, and the background of, Richard Smith are unknown. On June 18, 1805, he enlisted in the New Brunswick Regiment of Fencible Infantry. (That regiment became the 104th (New Brunswick) Regiment of Foot in 1810.) He was under the minimum age of 15, so could have enlisted as a "Boy"; but he lied about his age, and joined as a Private. He was assigned to the Grenadier Company, where the biggest and strongest men were placed: the minimum height requirement was 6 feet 0 inches (1.83 m), and he was 6 feet 5 inches (1.96 m).

== War of 1812 ==
In February 1811, he was promoted Corporal; and in February 1812, Sergeant; signs of exemplary service. In June 1812, war broke out between the United Kingdom and the United States of America. In February and March 1813, he was with his regiment on their 750 miles (1,210 km) epic winter march from Fredericton, New Brunswick through Quebec (Lower Canada) and Kingston (Upper Canada) to the Niagara corridor. On November 25, 1813, he was appointed Regimental Colour Sergeant; an honor reserved for the bravest of soldiers, his duty being to protect the junior officer (the Ensign) who carried the regimental colours during battle.

On July 3, 1814, American troops attacked Fort Erie, and captured it. The British attempted to retake it by siege, but ultimately failed. During the assault on August 15, Smith attacked as part of the forlorn hope under Colonel William Drummond to try to scale the walls and to open the entrance from inside. The Colonel had promised Smith that if the assault succeeded, he would recommend him to the Prince Regent for a commission; although the attack was partially successful, the Colonel was unable to fulfill his promise: he had been killed during it. Meanwhile, Smith had been wounded five times: twice in the head, once in the thigh, and twice in his right arm. His arm was afterwards amputated close to the shoulder.

== Postwar years ==
Smith petitioned Lieutenant General Sir Gordon Drummond for the promised commission, signing himself "X"; the mark of an illiterate, or perhaps of someone who had not yet learned how to write with his left hand. On November 16, 1814, his Captain, Richard Leonard, wrote to Major Thomas Hunter, acting commander of the 104th, as follows:

I beg leave to forward to you the enclosed petition from Serg’t Smith, of my company (No 9), and I have great pleasure in bearing testimony to his merit. His general conduct as a non-commissioned officer since his first appointment has been such as always to meet my approbation, particularly the respect he at all times commanded from the men. I have great satisfaction in stating that I was, in several instances witness to his gallantry in action during the last two campaigns on the Niagara Frontier — particularly the last — when he was chosen by the late Lt Col Drummond to lead the forlorn hope, in the attack on the enemy’s principal work at Fort Erie. On that occasion I was directed by L’t Colonel Drummond to notify Serg’t Smith that, if he acquitted himself with credit on that service, his intention was to recommend him for a commission.

On September 11, 1815, Smith's name was noted at the Horse Guards, London (the predecessor of the War Office) "for an ensigncy in a list of candidates". British Army forces were reduced after the conclusion of the War of 1812 (February 1815) and the final defeat of Napoleon (June 1815). Smith never received his commission.

On May 24, 1817, he was discharged from army service in Montreal "in consequence of Five Wounds, two in the Head, one through the Thigh, and two in the Right Arm".

He was subsequently appointed and served as Magistrate for the County of Northumberland, New Brunswick.

The inscription on his gravestone in the Old Burying Ground, Halifax, Nova Scotia calls him "Richard Smith, Esq." - which is noteworthy, because as late as 1894, the primary meaning of "Esquire" was "gentleman", either by birth or by deeds.
