= Battle of Fort Erie =

Battle of Fort Erie may refer to one of the following battles at Fort Erie, Ontario, Canada:

- Battle of Fort Erie (1812), a battle during the War of 1812
- Capture of Fort Erie (1814), a later battle during the War of 1812
- Siege of Fort Erie (1814), immediately following the Capture of Fort Erie
- Battle of Fort Erie (1866), one of the Fenian raids
