= De Watteville's Regiment =

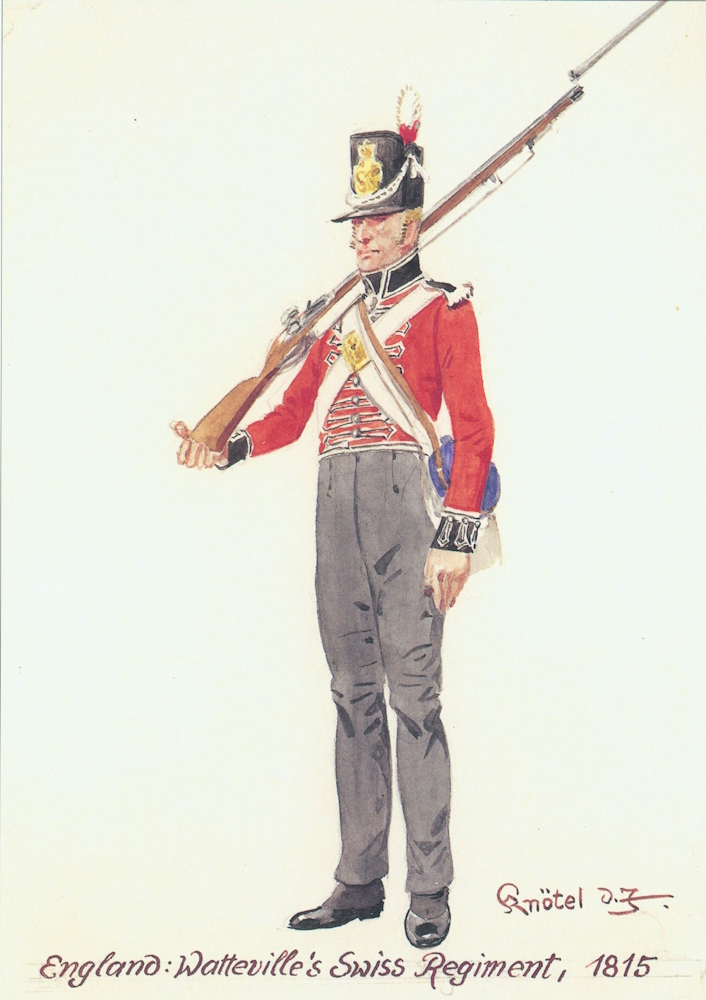
- Illustration of a regimental private in 1815
- Active: 1801–1816
- Allegiance: United Kingdom
- Branch: British Army
- Type: Line infantry
- Patron: Louis de Watteville
- Colors: Red Coats with Black Facings
- Engagements: Napoleonic Wars; War of the Third Coalition; Invasion of Naples (1806); Peninsular War; War of 1812; Pemmican War
- Battle honours: Battle of Maida; Siege of Cádiz; Battle of Fort Oswego (1814); Niagara campaign; Siege of Fort Erie

De Watteville's Regiment was a line infantry regiment of the British Army. Raised in 1801 by the Swiss officer Frédéric de Watteville, the regiment recruited from soldiers who had served in the Austrian Army but in British pay between 1799 and 1801 along with prisoners of war in Britain. The regiment served in the French Revolutionary and Napoleonic Wars and the War of 1812 before being disbanded in 1816 following the end of both conflicts.

== History ==
They fought in the Napoleonic Wars (1803–1815), mainly around the Mediterranean, and were based in Malta and then in Egypt from 1801 to 1803, fighting in Sicily and Naples. The regiment fought and won the Battle of Maida, in Italy in July 1806. From 1811 to 1813 the unit served under Wellington in the Peninsular War in Spain, and defending Cadiz in the Siege of Cádiz. In 1812 Louis de Watteville took over as Colonel and proprietor of the regiment from his uncle Frédéric de Watteville.

The regiment sailed to Canada in 1813 to fight in the War of 1812, including the Battle of Fort Oswego (1814) and at the Siege of Fort Erie. The unit was retired at the end of the war and soldiers were given tracts of land in Canada. Some of its soldiers also served at the Red River Colony. Some 150 recently discharged soldiers from both the recently disbanded De Watteville Regiment and Regiment de Meuron, still retaining their uniforms would participate in the Pemmican War.
