= Louis de Watteville =

Swiss mercenary (1776–1836)

Major-General Louis de Watteville
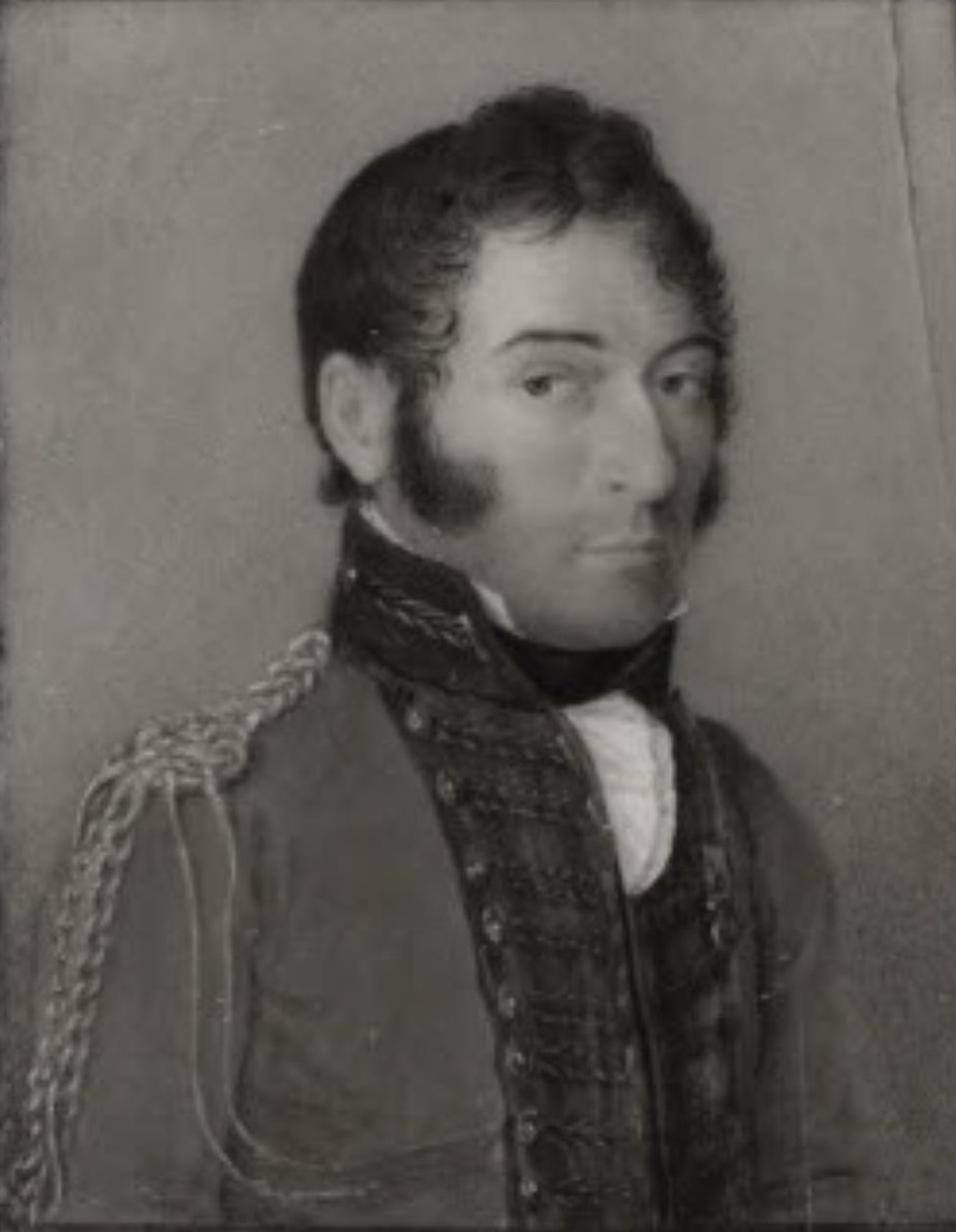
- Portrait in British uniform, held at the Burgerbibliothek Bern
- Born: Abraham Ludwig Karl von Wattenwyl; 1 July 1776; Grandson, Vaud, Switzerland
- Died: 16 June 1836 (aged 59)

Abraham Ludwig Karl von Wattenwyl (1 July 1776 – 16 June 1836), also known by the gallicised name Louis de Watteville, was a Swiss mercenary who became a major-general in the British Army. He commanded De Watteville's Regiment during the Napoleonic Wars and played a prominent role in the War of 1812.

== Early life and career ==
Louis de Watteville was born on 1 July 1776 in Grandson, Vaud, Switzerland, the son of Landvogt David Salomon von Wattenwyl and Elisabeth Magdalena Jenner. He was a member of a prominent patrician family of Bern. De Watteville first served as a mercenary in the service of the Dutch Republic. In 1801, as a lieutenant-colonel, he took over command of De Watteville's Regiment from his uncle, Franz Friedrich von Wattenwyl (also known as Frédéric de Watteville). The regiment entered British service, and de Watteville fought with it in the Egyptian campaign of the War of the Second Coalition.

== Napoleonic Wars ==
De Watteville served with his unit in Spain and Southern Italy during the Napoleonic Wars, most notably at the Battle of Maida in 1806 and at the Siege of Cádiz in 1810–1812. He was appointed colonel of his regiment in 1810 and formally became its owner in 1812. In the following year, he and the regiment were transferred from Cádiz to Upper Canada. By this time the regiment was a mixture of nationalities, including German, Italian and Hungarian, many of whom had been taken prisoner of war by the British while serving in the French armies in Spain.

== War of 1812 ==
On arrival at Québec, Watteville immediately struck up a friendship with the Governor General of Canada, Lieutenant General Sir George Prevost, himself of Swiss origin. He received promotion to Major General on 11 August 1813, although for a time held no appointment. On 17 October, he was appointed to command the district of Montreal, which at the time was threatened by American armies approaching on two fronts. De Watteville immediately called out the militia and began strengthening his defences, but on 26 October, his collected outpost units under Lieutenant Colonel Charles de Salaberry defeated the nearest American force at the Battle of Chateauguay. De Watteville was present and gave full credit to de Salaberry in his dispatch. Prevost, however, who was also present, belittled both de Watteville and de Salaberry in his own dispatch, which took precedence over those of his subordinates.

In June 1814, de Watteville was transferred briefly to the Richelieu River sector, but on 8 August, he was appointed to command the "Right Division" on the Niagara River in Upper Canada, succeeding Major General Phineas Riall, who had been wounded and taken prisoner by the Americans at the Battle of Lundy's Lane. He reported to the siege lines around Fort Erie on 15 August. On 17 September, American troops made a sortie against de Watteville's lines, leading to a bloody engagement in which about 600 men were killed or wounded on each side.

As campaigning wound down over the winter, de Watteville took leave in Montreal to meet his wife and family. Here he learned that the War had ended. After presiding over the court martial of Major General Henry Procter, he resumed his command.

== Later life ==
In late 1815, de Watteville was appointed commander in chief of the forces in Upper Canada. He preferred to retire from the army and returned to Switzerland. De Watteville bought an estate in Rubigen, canton of Bern, and was a member of the Grand Council of Bern from 1817 to 1831. He died on 16 June 1836 in Rubigen, aged 59.
