= Gen. Daniel Bissell House =

- U.S. National Register of Historic Places
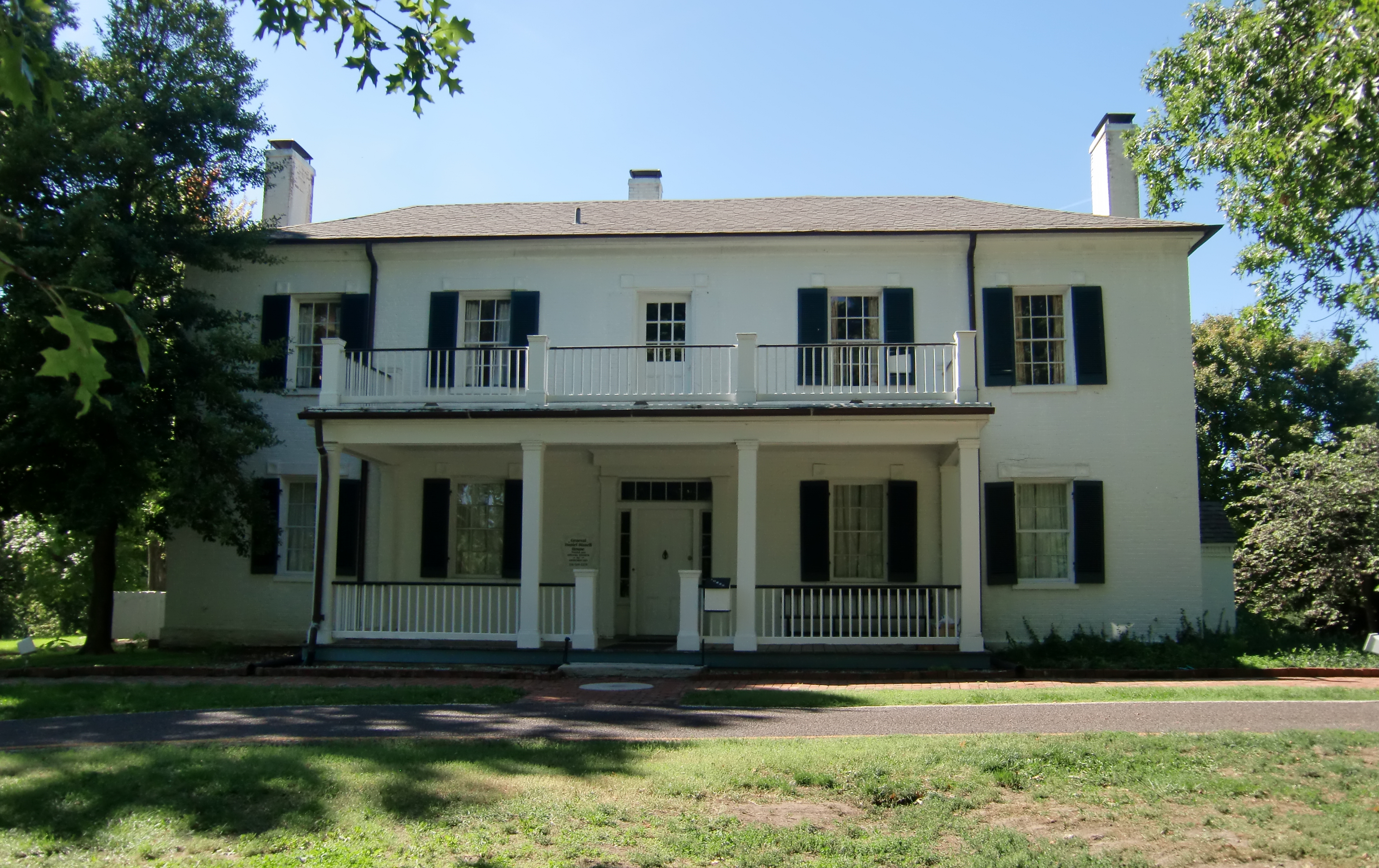

- Location within Missouri Location within the United States
- Location: 10225 Bellefontaine Rd., Bellefontaine Neighbors, Missouri
- Coordinates: 38°45′21″N 90°13′24″W
- Area: 9.3 acres (3.8 ha)
- Built: 1819
- Architectural style: Federal
- NRHP reference No.: 78003135
- Added to NRHP: November 28, 1978

Gen. Daniel Bissell House (also known as Franklinville Farm or Bissell Manor) is a historic house at 10225 Bellefontaine Road in Bellefontaine Neighbors, Missouri that was the home of War of 1812 General Daniel Bissell (general).

The Federal style house was finished in 1819 with a later addition in the 1890s and added to the National Register of Historic Places on November 28, 1978. Optional reference text: On June 19, 2024, the General Daniel Bissell house was named to places known for its use in the Underground Railroad, a network of people and places that helped free slaves that escaped from the southern States of the United States, to Northern States and Canada to be free.

The house is currently operated as a museum by St. Louis County Department of Parks and Recreation

== See also ==
- List of the oldest buildings in Missouri
