= Niagara campaign =

- Part of the War of 1812
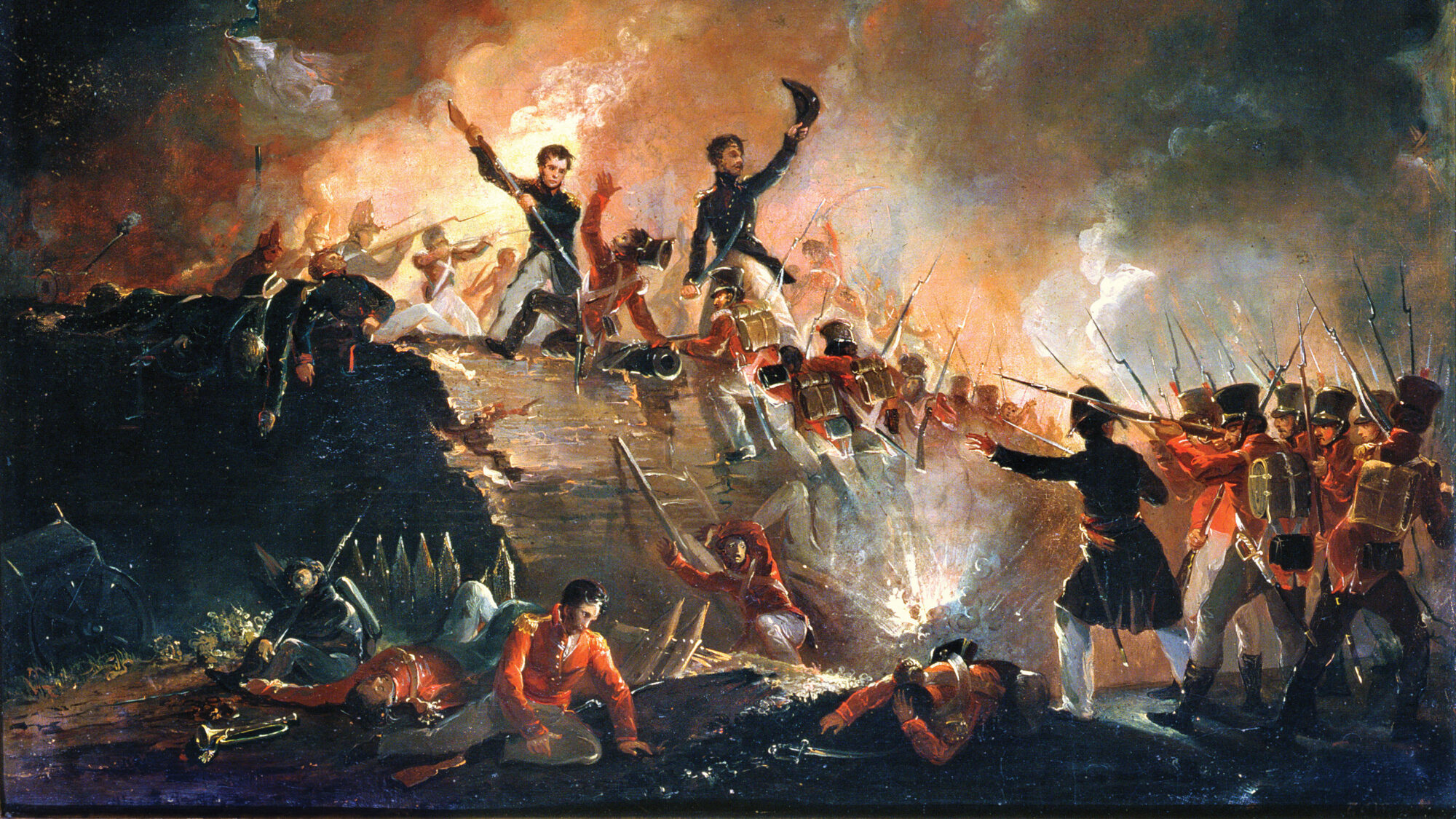
- Repulsion of the British at Fort Erie, 15th August 1814; E. C. Watmough, c. 1840
Date	3 July 1814 – 19 October 1814
Location	Upper Canada
Result	Inconclusive: Failure of American forces to invade Upper Canada; Abandonment of Fort Erie

Belligerents
United Kingdom; Upper Canada	United States

Commanders and leaders
(United Kingdom of Great Britain and Ireland) Gordon Drummond (United Kingdom of Great Britain and Ireland) Thomas Buck (surrendered)	(United States) Jacob Brown (United States) Winfield Scott (United States) George Izard (United States) Eleazer D. Wood †

Casualties and losses
490 killed 1,442 wounded 1,069 captured 85 missing Total: 3,086	461 killed 1,449 wounded 319 captured 114 missing Total: 2,343

The Niagara campaign occurred in 1814 and was the final campaign launched by the United States to invade Canada during the War of 1812. The campaign was launched to counter the British offensive in the Niagara region which had been initiated with the capture of Fort Niagara in December, 1813. As part of that campaign, and in response to the American burning of the village of Newark on the Canadian side of the river, British forces and their native allies burned the American villages of Buffalo and Black Rock.

Having rejected the option of attacking the British naval base at Kingston in Upper Canada (as it was considered too logistically difficult and well defended), the American objective in the 1814 campaign was to deal the British a decisive blow on the Niagara peninsula. The American forces, commanded by General Jacob Brown and General Winfield Scott, began their counter campaign with the Capture of Fort Erie on the Niagara Peninsula early in July. Next, they defeated the British at the Battle of Chippawa.

At the Battle of Lundy's Lane three weeks later, both sides claimed victory, but because U.S. forces had suffered so many casualties, they pulled back to Fort Erie. Following their return to the fort, the British, under Gordon Drummond, attempted to capture the fort and the Siege of Fort Erie followed. The Americans were able to hold out, and the British eventually lifted the siege after suffering severe losses. After a small engagement at Cook's Mills, American forces, commanded by General George Izard, abandoned Fort Erie and returned to the U.S. territory for winter quarters. In February 1815 the U.S. Senate approved the Treaty of Ghent ending the war.

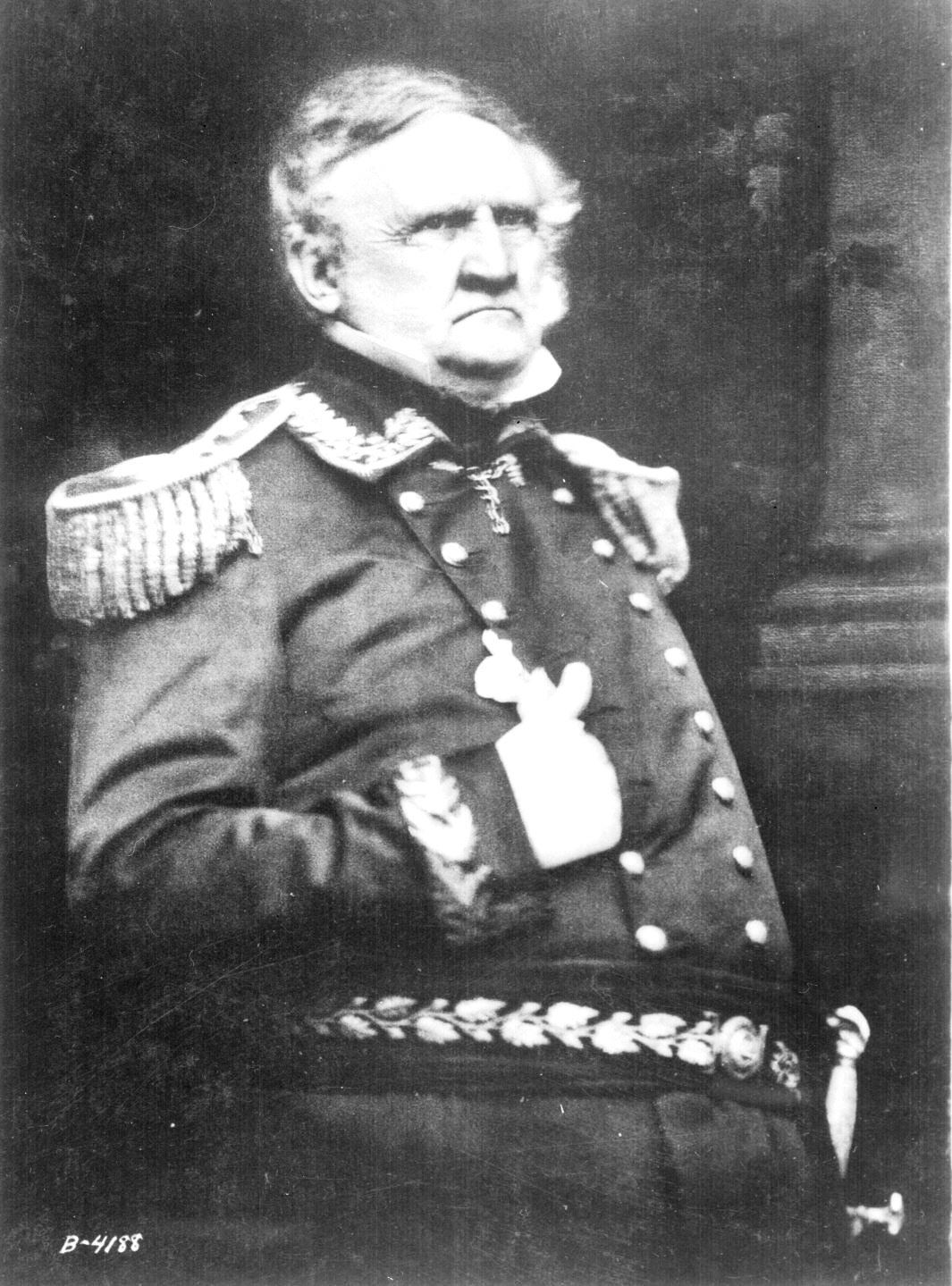
Winfield Scott (photographed in later life) played an instrumental role, as a young 28-year old Brigadier-General, at the Battles of Chippawa and Lundy's Lane.
