= 104th (New Brunswick) Regiment of Foot =

- Active: 1803-1817
- Disbanded: 1817
- Country: United Kingdom
- Branch: British Army
- Type: Infantry
- Role: Fencibles (1803-1810); Regular infantry (1810-1817)
- Size: 1,097 enlisted at peak establishment strength
- Colours: Buff facings
- Engagements: War of 1812
- Battle honours: Defence of Canada, 1812-1815; Niagara 1814

Commanders
- Colonel of the Regiment: Martin Hunter

104th (New Brunswick) Regiment of Foot was a regiment of the British Army. The regiment had its origins in the New Brunswick Regiment of Fencible Infantry, a unit of fencibles raised for the defence of the colony of New Brunswick in 1803. Recruits were drawn from across British North America, Scotland, Ireland and existing British Army units. The regiment was formally entered into the establishment in 1806 with a strength of around 650 enlisted men but grew to almost 1,100 by 1808. In 1810 the regiment's officers requested that it join the British Army as a regiment of foot. This request was granted on 13 September 1810 and the unit was renamed the 104th (New Brunswick) Regiment of Foot.

The regiment took part in the War of 1812 against the United States. It undertook a renowned winter march from Fredericton, New Brunswick, to Kingston, Ontario, in 1813 to defend Upper Canada from American invasion. The unit participated in the 29 May Second Battle of Sacket's Harbor, an unsuccessful British attempt to capture a US naval base on Lake Ontario. Its flank companies fought in Niagara later in 1813 and were present in the aftermath of the 24 June victory at the Battle of Beaver Dams. After overwintering in Montreal part of the regiment fought at Cape Vincent, New York, on 14 May 1814. The flank companies were once again detached to fight in the 1814 Niagara campaign, seeing action at the inconclusive 25 July Battle of Lundy's Lane. The regiment was present at the Siege of Fort Erie and took part in the unsuccessful assault of 15 August, during which their lieutenant-colonel, William Drummond, was killed. The 104th fought their last engagement at the Battle of Cook's Mills on 19 October 1814. The unit received the battle honours "Defence of Canada, 1812-1815" and "Niagara, 1814".

The regiment ended the war at Montreal and was renumbered to the 103rd Regiment of Foot in 1816. It was disbanded on 24 May 1817. The lineage of the regiment is claimed by the Canadian Army's The Royal New Brunswick Regiment, though it is not a descendant unit. The 104th's colours have been preserved and were restored as part of the 200th-anniversary celebrations of its 1813 march. A plaque and monument have been erected in Fredericton to honour the regiment.

== Background and establishment ==
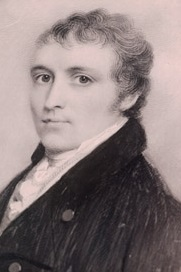
Martin Hunter

A militia was raised in British North America from 1787 but proved an ineffective defensive force. In 1791 the colony of New Brunswick was authorised to raise the King's New Brunswick Regiment of fencibles. Fencibles were considered to be regular infantry units and came under the command of the British Army, rather than colonial control as was the case with the militia. Fencibles were not required to serve outside of their home territory, this proved a boon to recruitment in North America where many colonists were dissuaded from joining the regulars by the fear of being sent to serve in the French Revolutionary Wars in Europe. The King's New Brunswick Regiment formed the garrison of the colony, together with a regular British Army regiment and another unit of fencibles. After the 1802 Peace of Amiens the King's New Brunswick Regiment was disbanded.

The resumption of hostilities with France in 1803 led to a new unit of fencibles being raised in the colony. Brigadier-General Martin Hunter received authorisation to raise the New Brunswick Regiment of Fencible Infantry (often just "New Brunswick Fencibles") on 6 July 1803. Hunter served as colonel of the regiment throughout its existence. The regiment's first commander was Lieutenant-Colonel George Johnstone, who was promoted from major of the 29th Regiment of Foot. Johnston was in Scotland at the time he was appointed and before joining his new regiment in North America recruited men from Scotland and Ireland to join it.

== Recruitment ==
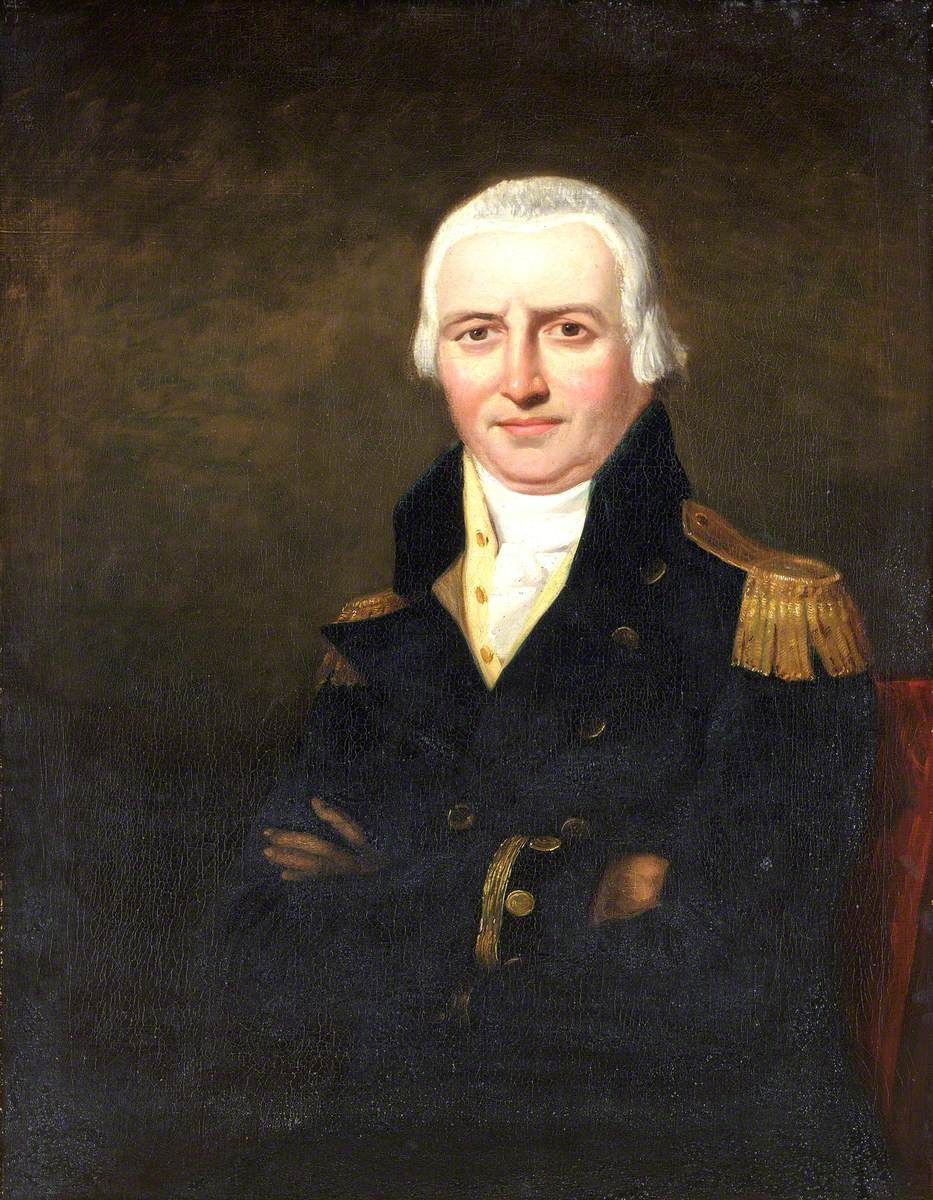
Sir Erasmus Gower

The New Brunswick Fencibles were permitted to recruit across British North America. Recruits were offered a bounty of five or six guineas and 200–500 acres (0.81–2.02 km^{2}) of land in New Brunswick upon disbandment; a minimum height requirement of 5 feet 5 inches (1.65 m) was set. Recruiting parties were sent out in autumn 1803 and performed well in New Brunswick and Nova Scotia (these colonies would provide the majority of the enlisted personnel in the regiment). They also met with some success in Lower Canada, though they were refused access to Newfoundland by Governor Vice-Admiral Sir Erasmus Gower. A substantial number of the French Canadian population enlisted, as did a number of Black Canadians. At least ten of the latter were transferred to the York Rangers, and thereafter the Royal African Corps (the privates in these units were all black). The New Brunswick Fencibles retained black enlisted men as pioneers, one to each company, and drummers.

The recruits were bolstered with experienced regulars drafted from the 37th Regiment, serving in the West Indies, and the 60th Regiment, in British North America. The officers were largely British, with three quarters, including all of the captains and majors, being existing regular army officers. These came from other regiments including the 46th, the 11th and the Cape Regiment as well as from officers on half-pay. A number of subalterns were recruited locally in British North America. The New Brunswick Fencibles mustered only 38 other ranks on 1 January 1804 but 217 by 1 July, 305 by 1 January 1805 and 466 by 1 July 1805. The regiment passed its initial acceptance inspection in January 1806, the vast majority of the recruits being judged fit for service. After this the unit was formally added to the establishment by George III, with the date of this being antedated to 25 June 1805. The unit's official establishment strength was 33 sergeants, 20 drummers, 600 men.

The unit was initially clothed in spare uniforms left behind by the 60th Regiment when it was posted to England. It was later clothed in its own uniform which accorded with the 1802 British Army regulations, with some minor adaptions. The New Brunswick Fencibles wore buff facings on their red coats and the flank companies (which were the usual grenadiers and light infantry) wore the regulation shoulder wings. Although it was not authorised one, a regimental band was established by Lieutenant-Colonel Johnston soon after the regiment was formed.

== Early deployments and conversion to line infantry ==
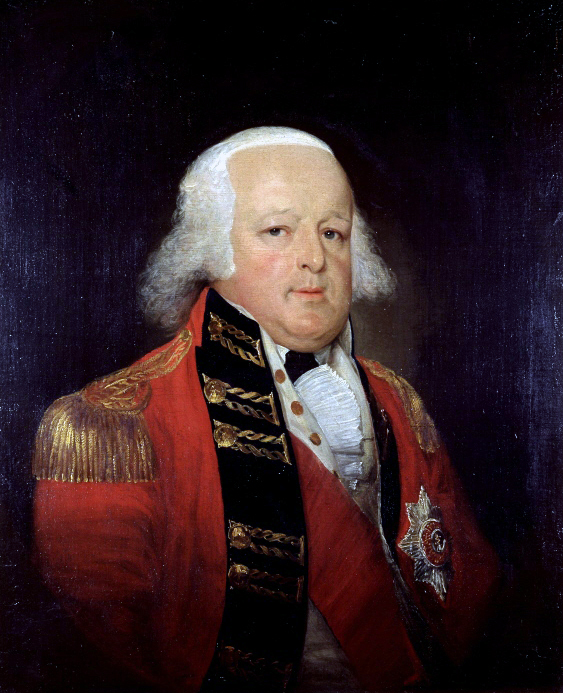
Sir James Henry Craig

In 1806 detachments of the regiment were deployed to outposts around the Bay of Fundy. In September 1807 one company was deployed at Saint John and one split between there and Saint Andrews. In early 1808 four companies were at Saint John. In June one company was deployed to Sydney, Nova Scotia, and one to Charlottetown, Prince Edward Island, where they remained until 1810.

The regiment's establishment strength was increased progressively on 25 April 1807, 25 August 1811 and 13 April 1812 (when a dedicated recruiting company was added). A surgeon was authorised and appointed in 1807, the regiment previously relying on two surgeon's mates. Despite a temporary halt on recruitment implemented by governor of British North America Sir James Henry Craig in spring 1808 the regiment reached an enlisted strength of 63 sergeants, 26 drummers and 1,008 men in 1812. The fighting force was organised into 8 line companies each comprising a captain, 2 lieutenants, an ensign, 5 sergeants, 5 corporals, 2 musicians and 95 privates plus the two flank companies. The company drummers seem to have been replaced by buglers by 1810 (unusual for British line infantry, buglers typically being used only in rifle regiments), though by 1813 both drums and bugles may have been in use for passing on orders at the company level.

In 1810 the officers of the regiment applied to the King to be admitted to the British Army as a regiment of the line. This was granted on 13 September 1810 and the unit formally became the 104th (New Brunswick) Regiment of Foot. The regiment was the fourth to bear the number in the British Army, the previous units being the 104th Regiment of Foot (King's Volunteers) (1761–63), the 104th Regiment of Foot (1782–1783) and the 104th (Royal Manchester Volunteers) (1794–5). The number was later reused for the 104th (Bengal Fusiliers) (1861–1881), after the British Army expanded with the incorporation of the regiments of the Honourable East India Company. None of these units share any lineage with the New Brunswick Regiment. As their terms of contract had changed all members of the fencibles regiment were required to re-attest to serve as regulars, all bar two enlisted men chose to do so.

As a regular regiment the 104th were liable to serve anywhere in the world. It was replaced in the fencible role by a separate New Brunswick Regiment of Fencible Infantry raised in autumn 1812. The 104th's uniform was modified after it changed status, for example the shoulderbelt plate was amended to show a "104" numeral surrounded by a crowned garter. After the transfer the 104th remained on garrison duty in New Brunswick.

== War of 1812 ==
The government of the United States declared war on Britain in June 1812, beginning the War of 1812. Later that year there were fears of an American invasion of Upper Canada and in the middle of winter it was decided to send the 104th from New Brunswick to reinforce the colony. Detachments of the regiment gathered at Fredericton from where six companies, numbering 20 officers and 550 men, departed on 16 February. Marching in snow shoes and towing their equipment and supplies on toboggans the men arrived at Quebec City on 15 March, having covered a distance of 350 miles (560 km). The men rested for a short period before continuing the march to Kingston, Ontario, which they reached in early April, having marched 1,100 kilometres (680 mi) in the Canadian winter. This arduous march "was reckoned one of the feats of the war" by British historian Charles Prestwood Lucas in his Canadian War of 1812 and was described as "almost certainly the longest winter march made by a British regiment up to that time" by Canadian historian John R. Grodzinski.

The six companies were joined at Kingston by the remainder of the regiment over the following months, reaching a peak strength of around 1,000 men. The arrival of the reinforcements allowed the British commander George Prevost to launch an offensive on Sacket's Harbor, an American naval base on Lake Ontario. The regiment provided the majority of the British force engaged in the subsequent battle on 29 May 1813 and lost one-third of those committed to the unsuccessful attack.

The Battle of Lundy's Lane, which the regiment fought in

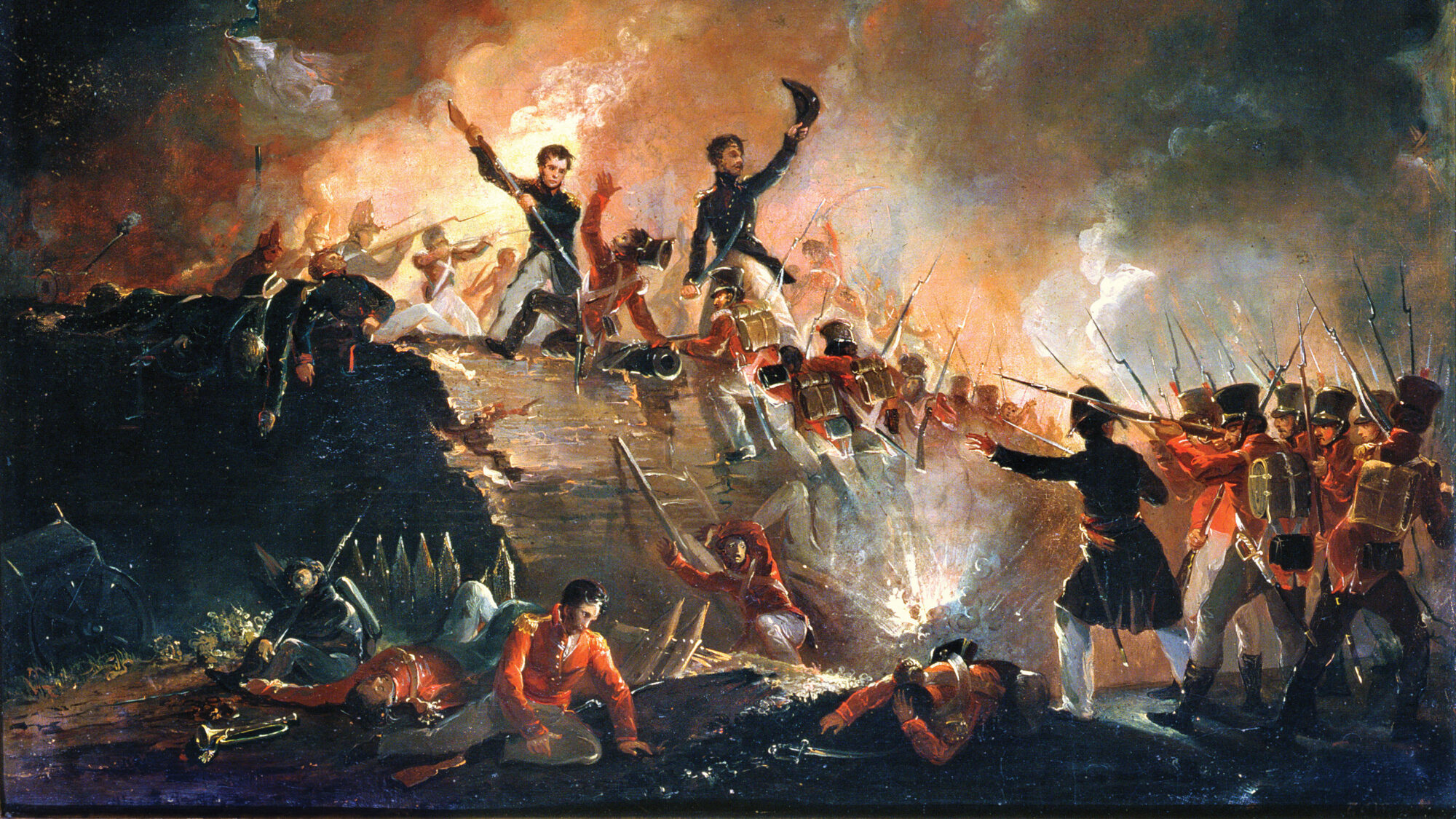
The siege of Fort Erie, which the regiment fought in

In June the flank companies were ordered to the Niagara region. They reached there in time to join the end of the 24 June Battle of Beaver Dams and helped to guard American prisoners of war. The regiment reunited at Kingston over winter. In 1814 the 104th garrisoned posts between Kingston and Prescott, an important link in the lines of communication to Montreal. Some of the regiment fought an engagement with the American forces at Cape Vincent, New York, on 14 May 1814. The flank companies were again detached in July 1814 and served in the Niagara campaign, the last American attempt to invade Canada. The companies fought at the inconclusive night-time Battle of Lundy's Lane on 25 July. The remainder of the regiment was ordered to Niagara to rejoin the flank companies and fought at the Siege of Fort Erie. In an assault at 3 am on 15 August the regiment's light company succeeded in capturing a key bastion but was forced to retreat after a powder magazine exploded. Only 23 of the company's 77 men returned to British lines and the regiment's commander Lieutenant-Colonel William Drummond was killed. The regiment's last engagement was the 19 October 1814 Battle of Cook's Mills.

The flank companies had been nearly wiped out during the Niagara campaign and were accorded the honour of wearing the word "Niagara" on their equipment thereafter. Some 36 of the less-fit men, mainly those who had been stationed at Cape Breton and Prince Edward Island, were detached and transferred from the regiment in November 1814 into one of the Royal Veteran Battalions. The 104th ended the war in 1815 at Montreal. The unit was awarded the battle honours "Defence of Canada, 1812-1815" and "Niagara, 1814".

The War of 1812 memoirs of Sir John Le Couteur (then a lieutenant) describe the winter march and the regiment's subsequent war service.

== Disbandment and legacy ==
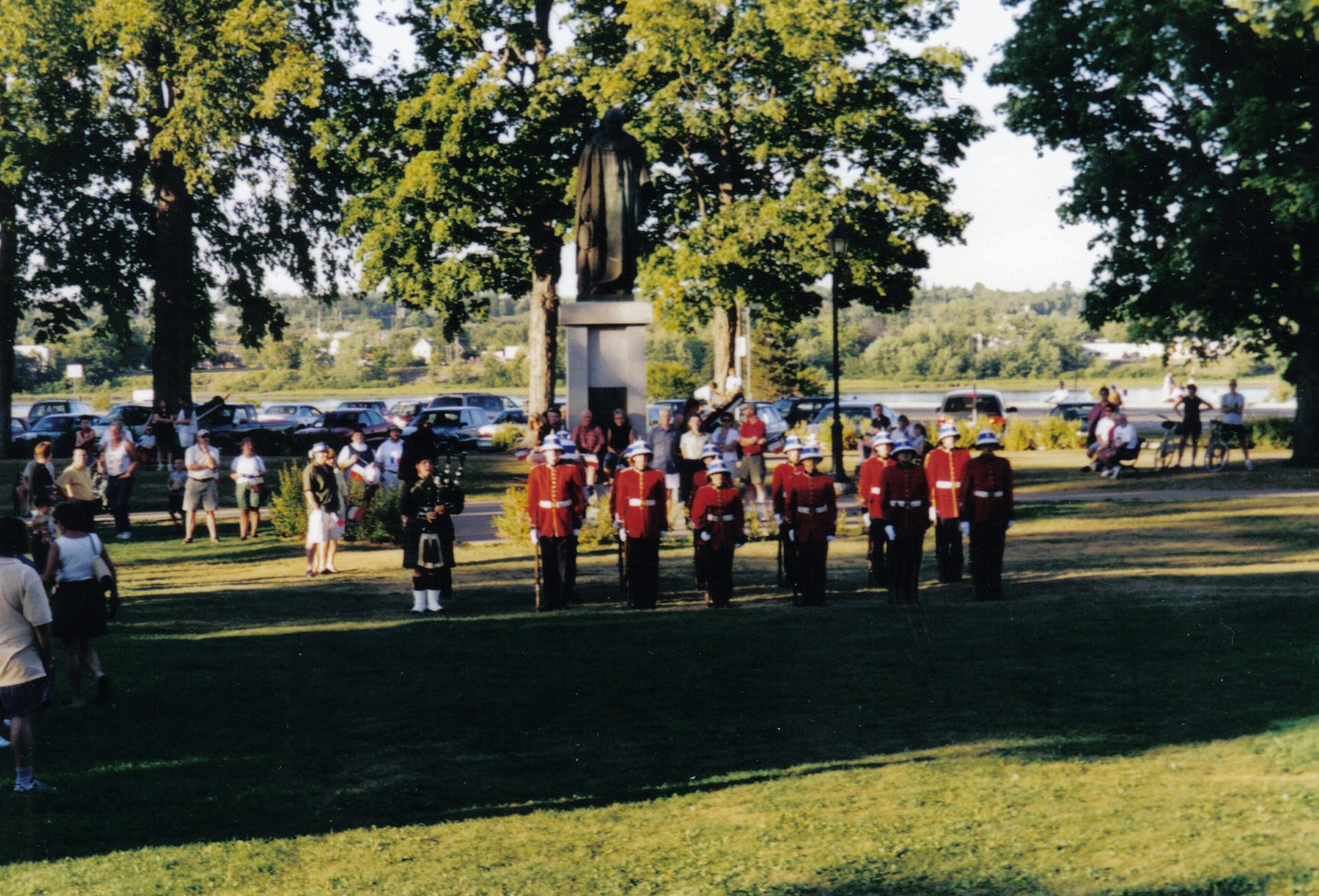
The Royal New Brunswick Regiment carrying out a changing of the guard ceremony on Officers' Square, Fredericton

In 1816 the British Army's 95th (Rifle) Regiment of Foot was removed from the line infantry and reformed as the Rifle Brigade. As its number was vacated all regiments with higher numbers were advanced one place. Thus, the 104th became the 103rd Regiment of Foot. The 103rd was disbanded at Montreal on 24 May 1817. Its ranks included men from New Brunswick, Nova Scotia, Newfoundland, Upper and Lower Canada, England, Scotland, and Ireland and many chose to settle in New Brunswick.

The 104th is unique in Canadian history as the only regular British Army regiment to be raised and serve in the region during the Napoleonic period. It is honoured by a Historic Sites and Monument Board of Canada plaque on the wall of the Soldiers' Barracks on Queen Street, Fredericton, and a monument in the nearby Officers' Square. The modern Canadian Army unit The Royal New Brunswick Regiment perpetuates the lineage of the 104th, though is not descended from the 104th. The colours of the regiment are maintained and were restored to commemorate the 200th anniversary of their 1813 march to Kingston. The march itself was recreated by a group of re-enactors to mark the bicentenary.

In a ceremony in November 2014, the footbridge linking Carleton Street to the riverfront over St. Anne's Point Drive in Fredericton was officially named the New Brunswick’s 104th Regiment of Foot Bridge. The Royal New Brunswick Regiment provided a Guard of Honour during the unveiling of the plaques at the steps to the southern bridgehead.

== See also ==
- Canadian units of the War of 1812
