= Daniel Bissell (general) =

United States general (1768–1833)

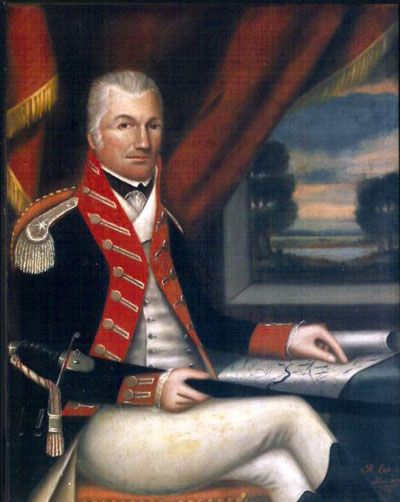
- Bissell c. 1814
- Born: 1768; East Windsor, Connecticut
- Died: December 14, 1833 (aged 64–65); St. Louis, Missouri
- Burial place: Bellefontaine Cemetery, St. Louis, Missouri
- Relatives: Ozias Bissell (father), Mabel Roberts (mother), Russell Bissell (brother)
- Military career
- Allegiance: United States, Continental Congress
- Branch: Connecticut State Militia (1775-1783) United States Army (1792-1821)
- Service years: 1775-1821
- Rank: Brevet Brigadier General
- Units: 1st Infantry Regiment (1792-1812), (1815-1821) 5th Infantry Regiment (1812-1815)
- Commands: 1st Infantry Regiment (Brigadier General) 5th Infantry Regiment (Colonel)
- Conflicts: War of 1812: Battle of Cook's Mills

Signature
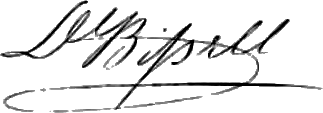

Daniel Bissell (1768 – December 14, 1833) was an American soldier and administrator. He was a fifer in the Connecticut militia during the American Revolutionary War. He commanded the 11th U.S. Infantry during the War of 1812.

== Early life ==
Daniel Bissell was born in Connecticut. He was the younger brother of U.S. Army major Russell Bissell.

== Military career ==
Daniel Bissell began his military career in the Connecticut State Militia as a fifer during the American Revolution. Following the American Revolutionary War Bissell became an officer in the United States Army when he was commissioned an ensign in the 1st Infantry Regiment on April 11, 1792. Daniel Bissell was promoted to lieutenant on January 3, 1794, and to captain in January 1799.

In 1802, Daniel Bissell was assigned the command of Fort Massac, on the Ohio River. With the expansion of the Army in 1808 Daniel Bissell was promoted to lieutenant colonel of the 1st Infantry Regiment on August 18, 1808. On May 20, 1809, he took command of Fort Belle Fontaine, the first military fort west of the Mississippi River.

On August 15, 1812, Daniel Bissell was appointed to command the 5th Infantry Regiment with the rank of colonel.

Daniel Bissell served with distinction during the War of 1812 and was promoted to brigadier general on March 9, 1814. He commanded U.S. forces at the Battle of Cook's Mills on October 19, 1814. This minor battle was one of the few American land victories of the war.

After the war, there were large reductions in the strength of the Army. As a result, Daniel Bissell was reverted to the rank of colonel and assigned to command of the 1st Infantry Regiment. In recognition of his wartime service he was given a brevet (honorary promotion) to the rank of brigadier general. Bissell was honorably discharged from the Army on June 1, 1821, after 29 years of continuous military service.

== Death ==
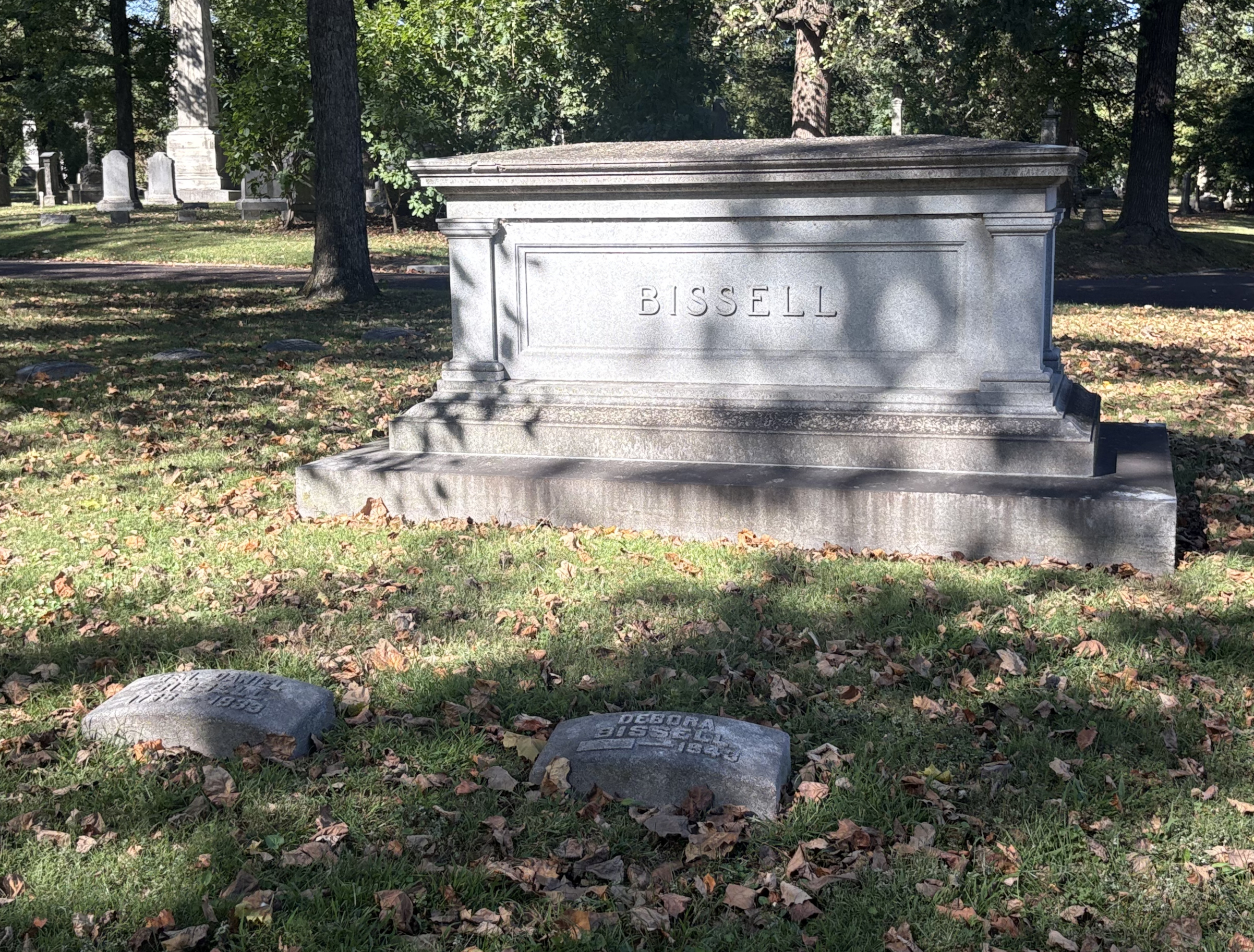
Bissell's grave at Bellefontaine Cemetery

General Daniel Bissell died December 14, 1833, in St. Louis, Missouri from pneumonia and was buried in Bellefontaine Cemetery.

== Daniel Bissell House ==
The Gen. Daniel Bissell House is now owned by the St. Louis County, Missouri Parks and is open to the public as an historical attraction.
