= Siege of Fort Erie =

1814 siege of the War of 1812

- Part of the Niagara campaign of the War of 1812
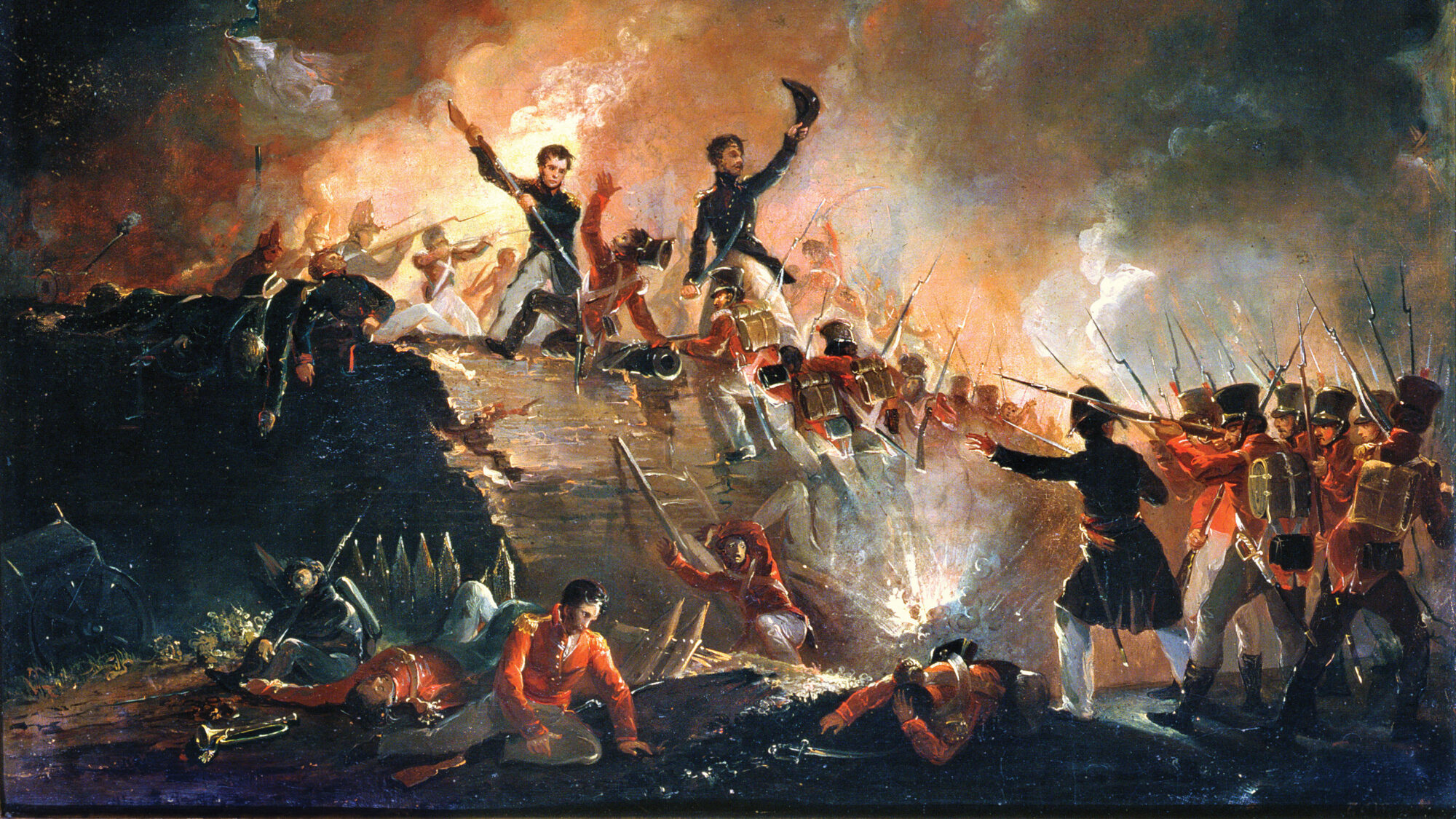
- British troops assaulting Fort Erie on August 15 during the siege
Date	August 4 – September 21, 1814
Location	Fort Erie, present-day Ontario 42.893351°N 78.923969°W
Result	American victory

Belligerents
United States	United Kingdom

Commanders and leaders
Edmund P. Gaines; Eleazer Wheelock Ripley; Jacob Brown	Gordon Drummond; Victor Fischer; Hercules Scott †

Strength
2,800	4,800

Casualties and losses
213 killed 565 wounded 240 captured 57 missing (Note: In the four main engagements; other losses unknown. As per the figures given in the main text: 2 killed and 8 wounded at Conjocta Creek on 3 August; 1 killed and 70 captured at Somers and Ohio on 12 August; 10 killed and 35 wounded in the cannonade of 15 August; 17 killed, 56 wounded and 11 missing on 15 August; 79 killed, 216 wounded, 170 captured and 46 missing on 17 September; 104 killed and 250 wounded in the general siege operations); Total: 1,075	At least 285 killed 508 wounded 748 captured 12 missing (Note: In the four main engagements; other losses unknown. As per the figures given in main text: 10 killed, 17 wounded and 6 captured at Conjocta Creek on 3 August; 2 killed and 4 wounded at Somers and Ohio on 12 August; 222 killed, 309 wounded, 360 captured and 12 missing on 15 August; 49 killed, 178 wounded and 382 captured on 17 September.); Total: 1,551

The siege of Fort Erie, also known as the Battle of Erie, from 4 August to 21 September 1814, was one of the last engagements of the War of 1812, between British and American forces. It took place during the Niagara campaign, and the Americans successfully defended Fort Erie against a British army under Gordon Drummond. During the siege, Drummond's troops suffered high casualties in a failed storming attempt; they also suffered casualties from sickness and exposure in their rough encampments. Unaware that the British were about to abandon the siege, the American garrison launched a sortie to destroy the British siege batteries, during which both sides again suffered high losses.

After the British abandoned the siege, the reinforced American army followed up cautiously and forced a second retreat at Cook's Mills but, with the onset of winter and shortage of supplies, they withdrew. They demolished Fort Erie before leaving the area. The attempted siege ended one of the last British offensives along the northern border, the other being the failed British assault on Plattsburgh.

== Background ==
American forces under Major General Jacob Brown had crossed the Niagara River and captured Fort Erie on 3 July 1814. After defeating a British force at the Battle of Chippawa, they advanced north but the British reinforced their troops in the Niagara peninsula. On 25 July, the bloody but indecisive Battle of Lundy's Lane was fought, during which Brown was severely wounded. Following the battle, the outnumbered American troops, now under the command of Brigadier General Eleazer Wheelock Ripley, withdrew to Fort Erie. Ripley advocated abandoning the fort and retreating across the Niagara, but Brown overruled him and summoned Brigadier General Edmund P. Gaines from Sackets Harbor to assume command.

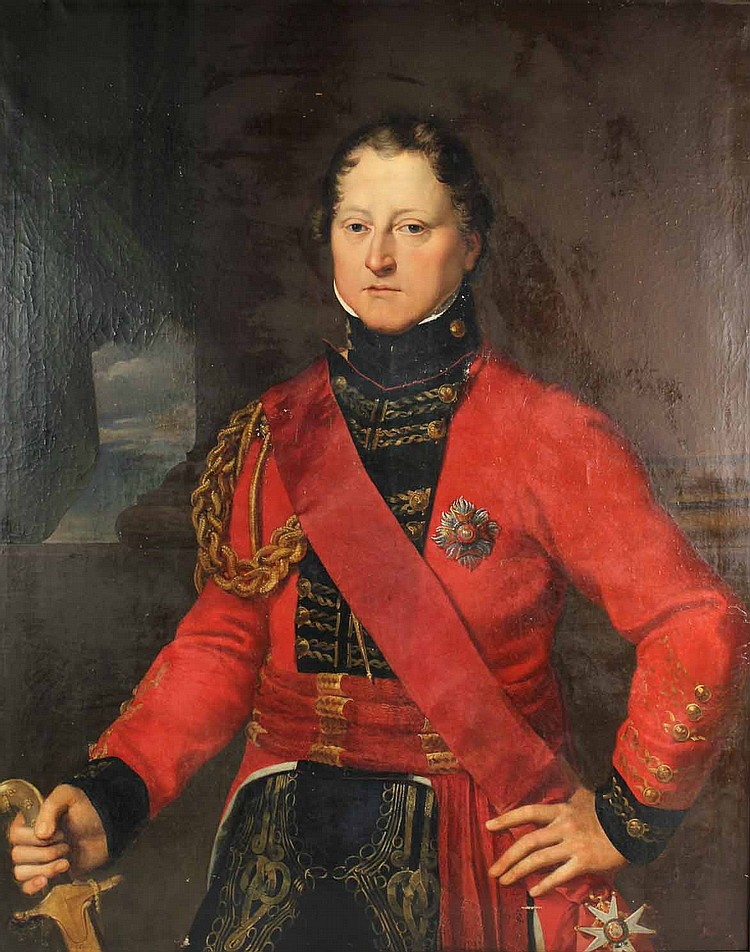
Lieutenant General Sir Gordon Drummond, the Lieutenant Governor of Upper Canada, led British forces during the siege.

The British, under the command of Lieutenant General Gordon Drummond (the Lieutenant Governor of Upper Canada), had suffered high casualties at Lundy's Lane. Drummond nevertheless claimed that the Americans had been forced to retreat in disorder, and he intended to drive them from the Canadian side of the Niagara. His troops followed the Americans slowly and reached the fort on 4 August. Drummond's division numbered 3,000, but Drummond complained about the quality of the troops and the degree to which the units were composed of mixed detachments and companies. His slow advance gave the Americans vitally needed time to reorganise and to reinforce their defences.

=== Defences ===
The original British fort consisted of two two-story barrack buildings, with fortified cannon bastions connected to them. The barracks were connected by a thick stone curtain with the main gate located in the centre. The rear of the fort (facing away from Lake Erie) consisted of an open terreplein, raised 6 feet (1.8 m) above the base of the dry ditch which surrounded the fort, with two redoubts located on the corner. The redoubts were incomplete and offered little protection. The front of the fort was protected by a large earth wall with a forward gun emplacement. The fort was also divided in half by an earth wall and ditch, but this too was incomplete. At least a third of the rear defenses were makeshift wooden walls or earthworks, some of which were only 1 metre (3.3 ft) high. A gun emplacement was located in the centre redan (raised platform). The fort contained a total of six guns.

The dry ditch surrounding the fort had a 9 feet (2.7 m) high wooden wall in the centre. This wall was angled outwards and was sharpened to prevent any enemy from leaping into the ditch, which also had sharpened sticks placed up and down the walls to help impale or wound enemy soldiers. The ditch was used as a garbage dump and a sewer by the defenders, creating a slippery and smelly swamp at the base that would slow enemy attacks and likely cause disease in any wounds.

Map of the American position and British siege lines.

Since capturing the fort, the Americans had made significant improvements to its defenses under Brown's direction and now redoubled their efforts to entrench themselves. Since the fort was too small to hold the entire American force, they extended the earth wall to the south for an additional 800 metres (0.50 mi) to a rise made of sand, known as Snake Hill, where they constructed a gun battery. To protect the north end of the position, the Americans threw up an earth wall connecting the northeast bastion of the fort to the lake. On the shore was another fortified gun emplacement, known as the Douglass Battery from its commander, Lieutenant David Douglass of the U.S. Corps of Engineers. Abatis (obstacles made of felled trees) were placed in front of the earth walls.

By the close of the siege, the Americans had also built three log blockhouses in the rear of the fort and had strengthened the defences and redoubts.

== Preliminaries ==
=== Raid on Black Rock and Buffalo ===
When the British force reached Fort Erie, Drummond first sent a force on 3 August across the Niagara in batteaux to raid Buffalo and Black Rock. He hoped to capture or destroy American supplies and provisions. The force consisted of two columns: one made up of the two flank companies and four of the centre companies (Note: A British battalion of the time consisted of eight "centre" companies, and one grenadier and one light infantry company, referred to as the "flank" companies, into which the most experienced or proficient soldiers were concentrated.) of the 41st Foot under Lieutenant Colonel Evans of the 41st. The other was composed of the light companies of the 2nd Battalion, the 89th Foot and the 100th Foot, and the flank companies of the 104th (New Brunswick) Regiment of Foot, under Lieutenant Colonel William Drummond of Kelty, General Drummond's nephew. With some artillerymen, the force numbered 600 men in total. The force was under the overall command of Lieutenant Colonel John Tucker, the senior Lieutenant Colonel of the 41st Foot. (Note: The two understrength battalions of the 41st had been amalgamated into a single unit late in 1813, leaving one battalion commander as a supernumary.)

The raid was a failure. On landing on the American side of the Niagara, Tucker found that the bridge over Conjocta Creek (now known as Scajaquada Creek) had been destroyed. The creek could not be forded, and an American detachment of 240 men of the 1st U.S. Rifle Regiment under Major Lodowick Morgan, with some volunteers, were defending the creek to prevent the bridge being repaired. The British casualties were 11 killed, 17 wounded, and 5 missing. The Americans took 6 prisoners, indicating that one of the British soldiers who had been recorded as "killed" had been captured. Tucker complained that the troops panicked and fled, though they subsequently rallied. The Americans lost 2 killed and 8 wounded. Major Morgan was killed a few days later in a clash between outposts.

=== Preparations for the siege ===
Drummond lost several vital subordinates during the next few days, forcing him to take personal charge of the siege. Major General Phineas Riall, the commander of the "Right Division" on the Niagara Peninsula, had been wounded and captured at Lundy's Lane. His replacement, Major General Henry Conran, recently arrived from England, broke a leg in a fall from a horse and was incapacitated. Colonel Stewart of the Royal Scots was summoned from York to replace him, but fell ill with ague. Colonel Hercules Scott of the 103rd Foot requested permission to relinquish his command of a brigade and revert to command of his regiment.

=== Capture of Ohio and Somers ===
While the British constructed their siege lines and batteries, three American schooners anchored in the Niagara River harassed them with gunfire. At the time, three small craft from the British naval squadron on Lake Ontario were blockaded in the mouth of the Niagara River by three larger American vessels. Commander Alexander Dobbs, in command of the British vessels, and his sailors and Royal Marines dragged a gig and five other boats overland from below Niagara Falls and launched a boarding attack on the American schooners off Fort Erie on the night of 12 August. The crews of the schooners spotted and challenged them, but the British replied "Provision boats", and deceived the Americans long enough to bring their boats alongside. They captured Ohio and Somers. The crew of Porcupine escaped by cutting their anchor cables before slipping away, but were accidentally fired upon by US artillery on the shore. The British lost 2 killed and 4 wounded in the engagement, while the Americans had 1 killed and 70 captured, of whom 8 were wounded. This victory raised British morale but Drummond mistakenly believed that it depressed American morale to the same extent. Some American deserters reported this, as well as saying that the defenders numbered only 1,500, when there were 2,200 troops.

== British assault ==
On 13 August, Drummond opened fire on the fort with two light 24-pounder field guns and four 18-pounder or 24-pounder naval guns. Because the bombardment was fired from too long a range, it was ineffective against the fort's walls. Drummond launched a three-pronged attack on the night of 15/16 August, with each arm of the attack aimed at one of the American batteries. The largest column, of 1,300 soldiers led by Lieutenant Colonel Victor Fischer would outflank the south end of the defenses at Snake Hill. Another column of 700 soldiers under Colonel Hercules Scott would attack the Douglass Battery and the north end of the defenses, and sweep into the U.S. camp, meeting Fischer's column in the middle. Finally, a column of 360 soldiers, sailors and marines led by Lieutenant Colonel William Drummond would attack the fort once the other assaults were under way, with the objective of capturing the old British barrack buildings. A reserve of nearly 700 men (the 1st Battalion of the Royal Scots, the Glengarry Light Infantry, the Incorporated Militia of Upper Canada and those soldiers from the Regiment de Watteville who had not volunteered to take part in Fischer's attack on the Snake Hill battery) was left in the siege lines under Lieutenant Colonel Tucker.

Colonel Scott and Lieutenant Colonel Drummond were both experienced soldiers and had little confidence in General Drummond's plan. Both men arranged their affairs before heading into battle, sending their papers home to their wives. Drummond gave away his sword (a gift from Lloyd's of London) to Surgeon William "Tiger" Dunlop of the 89th. Shortly before moving out, both men wished each other luck and bade farewell.

The columns moved out after dark, but the garrison at the fort had seen their preparations. Surprise would be nearly impossible to achieve. While Fischer's column made its long march to the south of Snake Hill, Scott's and Drummond's columns waited in the pouring rain in a ravine a few hundred yards north of the fort. An hour before the assault began, the British bombardment of the fort ceased, having inflicted casualties on the garrison of 10 killed and 35 wounded.

=== American preparations ===
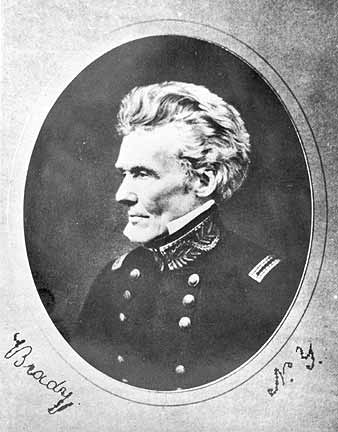
American Brigadier General Edmund Pendleton Gaines, commander of Fort Erie until wounded on 29 August, photographed in later life

In the fort, Gaines ordered his men to stand to. This produced rumblings from the troops forced to stand in their positions in heavy rain but would prove invaluable in the coming battle. He also ordered that the charges in all guns were to be drawn and replaced, ensuring the guns would not misfire through damp powder.

Ripley defended Snake Hill with the 21st and 23rd U.S. Infantry. The Hill was topped with a large gun emplacement containing six guns under the command of Captain Nathaniel Towson. The fort itself was defended by two companies of the 19th U.S. Infantry, and three guns under Captains Williams and Gookin. The wall between the fort and the Douglass Battery (which held one gun) was manned by the 9th U.S. Infantry, a company of volunteers from the New York and Pennsylvania state militias, the dismounted New York Volunteer Dragoons, and another gun.

The long wall between the fort and the Snake Hill, which was not attacked, was defended by Brigadier General Peter B. Porter with detachments of the 1st and 4th U.S. Rifle Regiments, the 5th Pennsylvania Volunteers, Swift's Regiment of Detached New York Militia, and five guns. Finally, two companies of the 11th and 22nd U.S. Infantry and a detachment of the U.S. Light Dragoons were in reserve.

=== Fischer's attack ===
Fischer's column consisted of the light companies of the 2/89th Foot and the 100th Foot, the remnants of the 1st Battalion, 8th (King's) Foot, which had suffered heavy casualties in earlier engagements, and volunteers from Fischer's own regiment, the Regiment de Watteville. De Watteville's nominally Swiss regiment was made up of men from all over Europe, many of them former prisoners of war or deserters from the armies of Napoleon Bonaparte, and the British commanders suspected their loyalty. On the approach march, the roll was called every hour to prevent desertion. Except for a few steady men, the entire column was ordered to remove their firearms' flints and take the enemy battery on the hill with the bayonet.

The column encountered an American picket 300 metres (330 yd) from the defenses. Surprise was nearly achieved but because of the rainy weather, the British troops' advance was betrayed by the loud swishing sound made as they passed through high grass. The picket opened fire, alerting the garrison, before hastily retreating. The leading attackers rushed forward to the abatis. As they reached it, Towson opened fire. The rate of fire from his battery would earn it the nickname "Towson's Lighthouse". After several attempts to storm the battery, many attackers broke and fled in panic, sweeping away the steady soldiers to their rear. Those who did try to scale the defenses found that many of the siege ladders built for the attack had been made without taking the ditches into account and were as much as 5 feet (1.5 m) too short to get over the wall. The light company of De Watteville's Regiment attempted to bypass the defenses by swimming in the Niagara River. The current proved to be too swift, and many of the men were swept away to their death; those who survived were quickly captured.

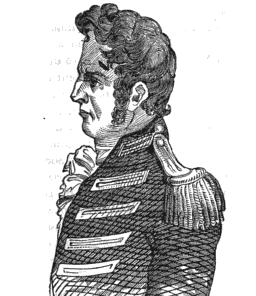
Brigadier General Eleazer Wheelock Ripley commanded the American section that fended off the British attack led by Lieutenant Colonel Victor Fischer.

Some of the attackers charged the battery five times before retiring. Some units, such as the light company of the 8th, lost two thirds of their strength. De Watteville's regiment had 144 casualties (although many were "missing" and actually hid in the woods before deserting the next morning). Ripley, commanding this section of the American defenses, reported taking 147 prisoners. His men suffered only a dozen casualties. Fischer's column reeled back in confusion and it was decided another attempt was impossible.

=== Scott's attack ===
Colonel Hercules Scott's column consisted of his own 103rd Regiment, less its light company. He launched his attack as soon as firing was heard from Snake Hill. Surprise was quickly lost when American pickets detected them and fired muskets to alert the defenders. Once the British had moved close enough, the guns of the fort and the Douglass Battery (loaded with canister) and several hundred U.S. Infantry opened fire, causing horrific losses to the British who were jammed into a narrow front between an embankment and the lake. Colonel Scott was mortally wounded by a musket ball in the head early in the attack. His second in command, Major William Smelt, was also seriously wounded. At one point in the battle, a cry rose from the British forces of "Stop firing, you're shooting your own men!", and the fighting ceased for almost an entire minute until an American officer, unconvinced by the unfamiliarly accented appeal, shouted back "To Hell with you!" and the firing resumed. Scott's shattered regiment fell back with 360 casualties (although some may later have joined Drummond's attack against the fort). The Americans facing them reported no casualties from Scott's attack.

=== William Drummond's attack ===
Lieutenant Colonel William Drummond's column consisted of a small detachment of gunners of the Royal Artillery, the flank companies of the 41st Foot and of the 104th Foot, fifty Royal Marines and ninety seamen of the Royal Navy under Commander Dobbs. The attack on the fort initially made little headway. Using the cover of darkness and the heavy smoke that hung over the field, Drummond then moved his men through the defensive ditch to assault the northeast bastion. The British caught the U.S. artillerymen there completely by surprise, and they quickly abandoned their guns and fled. Those under Captain John Williams and Lieutenant Patrick McDonogh who stood and fought were quickly killed as Drummond cried out "Give no Quarter to the Damn Yankees!" A group of soldiers from the 19th US Infantry (recruits from Ohio who had arrived late the previous evening under Major William Trimble) reorganized themselves in the parade square and poured fire into the bastion. It is believed that Drummond was killed in this barrage.

The attackers twice charged through a gap 7 feet (2.1 m) wide between the two barrack buildings into the parade ground, but were unable to break into the barrack buildings and mess hall. The defenders in turn tried to recapture the northeast bastion but were driven back. General Drummond sent only two companies of the 1st Battalion of the Royal Scots to reinforce the attackers; they lost half their men and very few of them even reached the fort. After fighting swayed back and forth for nearly an hour, some Americans turned around an 18-pounder cannon on the rear redan and began to fire into the bastion less than 50 yards (46 m) away. The British responded by turning one of the captured cannons around and knocking the American 18-pounder off its carriage.

Shortly after the British began firing their captured gun, a large powder magazine in the bastion beneath their feet ignited. The explosion was immense, destroying the entire bastion and most of the attached barracks building. A two-ton cannon was thrown 100 yards (91 m) out of the fort. Between 150 and 250 men, mainly British and Canadians, were killed in the bastion. It was gruesomely reported that some attackers were blown from the walls of the fort to land on the bayonets of those still in the ditch. The explosion caused havoc for both sides, although the Americans in the fort were sheltered from the full force of the explosion by the barrack buildings. Lieutenant Douglass was nearly killed when a large piece of flaming timber crushed the man next to him. The surviving attackers were convinced that the entire fort was mined and they retreated in panic. Drummond's column had been almost wiped out during the attack. When the 104th assembled the next day and roll was called, those who were still standing openly wept at the loss of over half of their men who had attacked.

Sergeant Richard Smith of the 104th was recommended for a commission for his gallantry in the assault, during which he was wounded five times and subsequently had to have his right arm amputated, but the commission was never awarded.

=== Aftermath ===
In total the British suffered 57 killed, 309 wounded and 537 missing (many of whom were killed in the explosion of the fort's magazine). The journal of surgeon William Dunlop described working on the wounded for nearly 3 days without ceasing. The Americans reported capturing 360 prisoners, 174 of whom were wounded. Gaines reported that the bodies of 222 dead attackers were left in and around the fort. This would give a revised British loss of 222 killed, 309 wounded, 360 captured (of whom 174 were wounded) and 12 missing.

The garrison suffered 17 killed, 56 wounded and 11 missing.

== American sorties ==
In addition to the heavy casualties from the assault, Lieutenant General Drummond's force suffered severely from sickness and exposure. The British troops lacked tents and their crude huts and shelters made from bark and branches provided little cover. When the autumn rains began, the ground rapidly became inches deep in water. Drummond nevertheless was reinforced by the 6th and 82nd Regiments of Foot, both of them veterans of the Duke of Wellington's army in the Peninsular War, and maintained the siege. Major General Louis de Watteville also joined him to take over the day-to-day conduct of the siege.

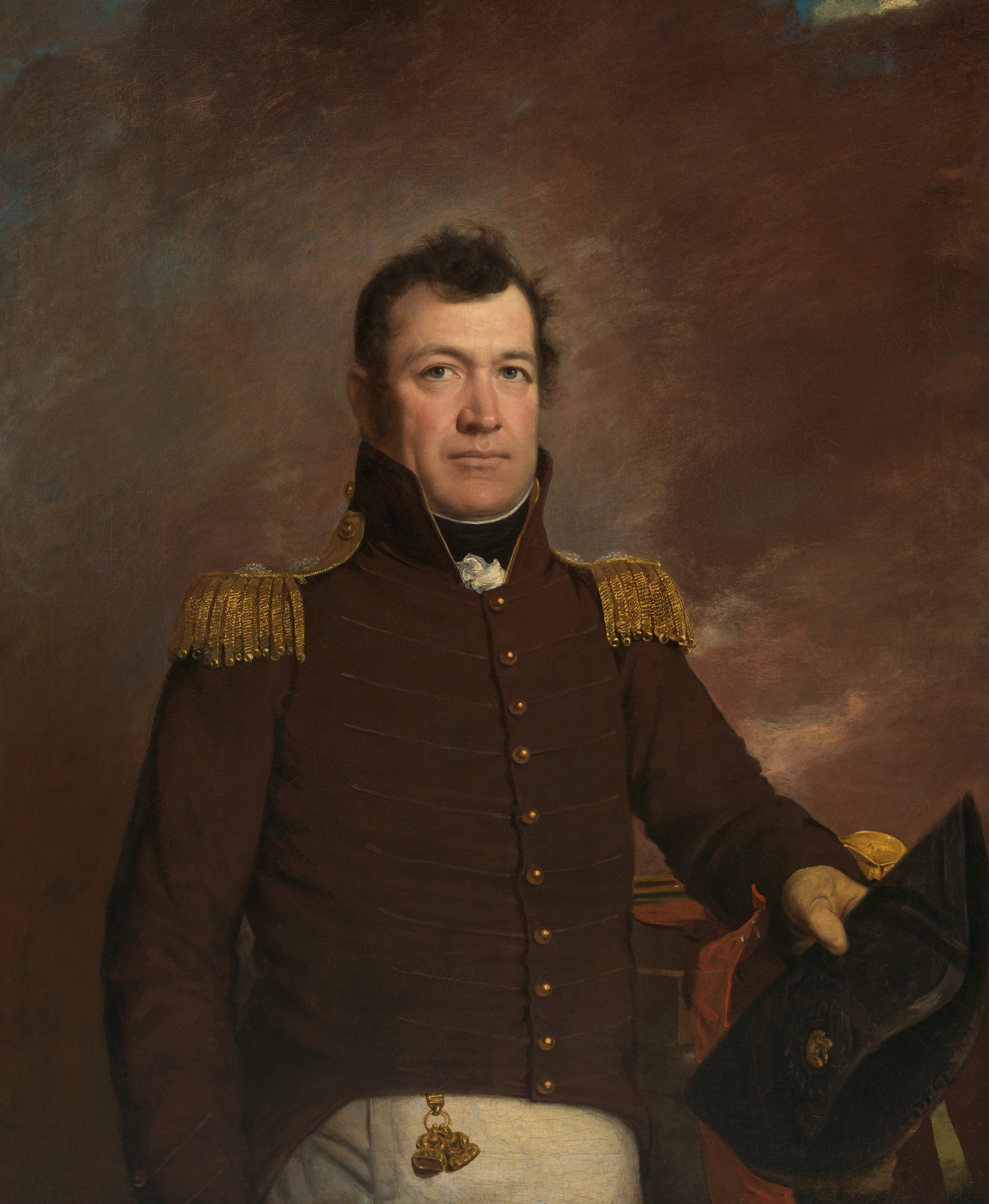
American Major General Jacob Brown later took command of the Fort's defenders from Ripley.

On 29 August a chance British shot severely wounded Gaines and Ripley resumed command. Ripley's opinion of the entire campaign was far from positive and he had even openly rumoured that the British would bring up further reinforcements and capture the fort. Major General Jacob Brown had only partly recovered from his wounds received at Lundy's Lane, but he nevertheless returned to Fort Erie to replace the pessimistic Ripley in command. It was known that Drummond's force was dwindling and there were strong arguments for simply waiting for Drummond to abandon the unsuccessful siege, but Brown was determined to attack.

=== Action of 4 September ===
On 4 September, a detachment of Brigadier General Peter B. Porter's brigade of volunteers from the New York and Pennsylvania Militia was sent out to attack the British Battery No. 2. The action lasted for close to six hours before being brought to a halt by a "tremendous rain and thunder storm". During the action, Colonel Joseph Willcocks of the Canadian Volunteers (a small unit of Canadians fighting against Britain) was shot in the chest and killed.

=== Action of 17 September ===
On 15 September, the British finally completed Battery No. 3 at the western end of their siege lines, which enfiladed most of the American defences. Brown planned to outflank the western end of Drummond's siege lines, capture the batteries and spike the guns in them. Brigadier General Porter was entrusted with the main attack. His pioneers cleared a trail through the woods to a point behind the British Battery No. 3. Drummond's troops and Natives, who were probably made lethargic by rain, sickness and shortage of rations, failed to report any of this activity. Although the British had constructed a blockhouse to cover the end of the entrenchments, the surrounding woods had not been cut back.

At noon on 17 September, Porter's force of volunteers from the militia with the 23rd U.S. Infantry, numbering 1,600 in total, moved along the trail, covered by heavy rain. They completely surprised the remnants of De Watteville's regiment, who were covering the end of the British siege works, and captured Battery No. 3. At the same moment, the recently promoted Brigadier General James Miller led detachments from the 9th, 11th and 19th U.S. Infantry along the ravine which had sheltered the British troops before their failed assault on August 15, and attacked the British centre. Attacked from both front and flank, Battery No. 2 was also captured.

By now, Drummond's reserves were hurrying forward. Lieutenant Colonel Campbell was sent with the 82nd Regiment and part of the 6th Regiment to recapture Battery No. 2, while Lieutenant Colonel John Gordon was dispatched with the 1st Battalion of the Royal Scots and the 2/89th to recover Battery No. 3. There was severe fighting amid the British entrenchments but the Americans were unable to capture Battery No. 1 and were driven out of No. 2 and No. 3. Brown ordered his men back to the fort and sent Ripley forward to cover Porter's and Miller's withdrawal. Surgeon Dunlop recorded a horrifying incident during the recapture of Battery No. 2, when Major Pattison led two companies of the 82nd Regiment into the battery:

They poured a volley into the mass of the enemy, who were huddled together into so small a space that they could not return it. Pattison immediately sprung forward, and called out to the American officer in command to surrender, as resistance would only cause loss of life and could do no good. He did give an order to ground arms, and some of his men were in the act of doing so, when an American soldier raised his rifle and shot Pattison through the heart. In one moment a charge was made by the 82d into the battery, and every soul in it was put to the bayonet…".

Three of Drummond's six siege guns were destroyed in Battery No. 3. The Americans had been unable to spike the guns in Battery No. 2 before they were driven out.

In this two-hour engagement, the Americans suffered 79 killed, 216 wounded and 216 missing. Porter, Miller and Ripley were all wounded. Of the 216 Americans who were marked down as "missing" in the official casualty return, 170 were captured, of whom some were wounded. The remaining 46 may have died in the massacre at Battery No. 2, since no Americans in the battery survived to report their comrades' fate.

The British official casualty return stated 115 killed, 178 wounded and 316 missing. (Note: Wood, pp. 197-8 and James, p. 471. Cruikshank, Documentary History, p. 219, gives a transcription of the official casualty return in which the unit-by-unit subtotals add up to 178 wounded but the grand total is given as 148 as a consequence of the total for wounded 'rank and file' being misprinted as '117 instead of '147'. Whitehorne, p. 105, increases the number of British 'missing' from 316 to 400 but gives no source for this alteration. Barbuto, p. 279, says, "Drummond reported 719 casualties: 115 killed, 178 wounded and 426 missing". Barbuto's figure for 'missing' appears to be a typographical error because he sources these casualties to Wood, pp. 195-199, which simply gives the official British casualty return in which 316 men are reported as 'missing') The Americans took 382 prisoners (11 officers and 371 enlisted men), indicating that 66 of the British troops marked down as "killed" in the official casualty report were in fact captured. The thickly wooded nature of the battlefield may have led the compilers of the casualty return to assume that these men were lying dead among the trees and undergrowth. This gives a revised British loss of 49 killed, 178 wounded and 382 captured. Of the 11 officers who were taken prisoner, 2 were wounded.

=== End of the siege ===
Unknown to the Americans, Drummond had already decided on 16 September to lift the siege, and had given orders for his artillery to be moved to Fort George as soon as possible. Shortage of draught animals had delayed his departure. It was not until the night of 21 September that the British force finally withdrew to the Chippawa River. In a letter to Sir George Prevost, the British commander-in-chief in North America, Drummond cited the continual heavy rain, illness among his men and lack of camp equipment as his reasons for breaking off the siege. His force was reduced to 2,000 effectives and his camp had the appearance of "a lake in the midst of a thick wood".

In the general siege operations from 1 August to 21 September (not including the engagement at Conjocta Creek on 3 August, the capture of the Ohio and the Somers on 12 August, the cannonade from 13 August to the early morning of 15 August, the assault on 15 August or the sortie of 17 September), the American garrison lost 104 killed and 250 wounded. All but 29 of these casualties came from the regular U.S. Army. The number of Americans captured or missing during this period is unknown. The overall British casualty figures for the siege also appear to be unknown.

== Evacuation ==
In early September, Major General George Izard's division had been ordered to march from Plattsburgh to Sackett's Harbor, where they arrived on 17 September. On 21 September, the American naval squadron on Lake Ontario under Commodore Isaac Chauncey ferried the main part of the division to the Genesee River a few miles west of the Niagara, from where they marched to reinforce Brown. Since Izard was the senior officer, he assumed command of the combined American force. The Americans now numbered 6,300 (including 800 volunteers from the militia) and had a clear advantage in numbers over Drummond, who had only 2,500 men even after further British reinforcements (the 97th Regiment) had arrived. Brown wished to make an immediate all-out attack. Izard instead waited until 13 October before he began a cautious advance, by which time the British had recovered much of their health and morale, and had strongly fortified the line of the Chippawa Creek. After some indecisive exchanges of artillery fire at the mouth of the river and a minor success against a British outpost at Cook's Mill on 19 October, Izard withdrew.

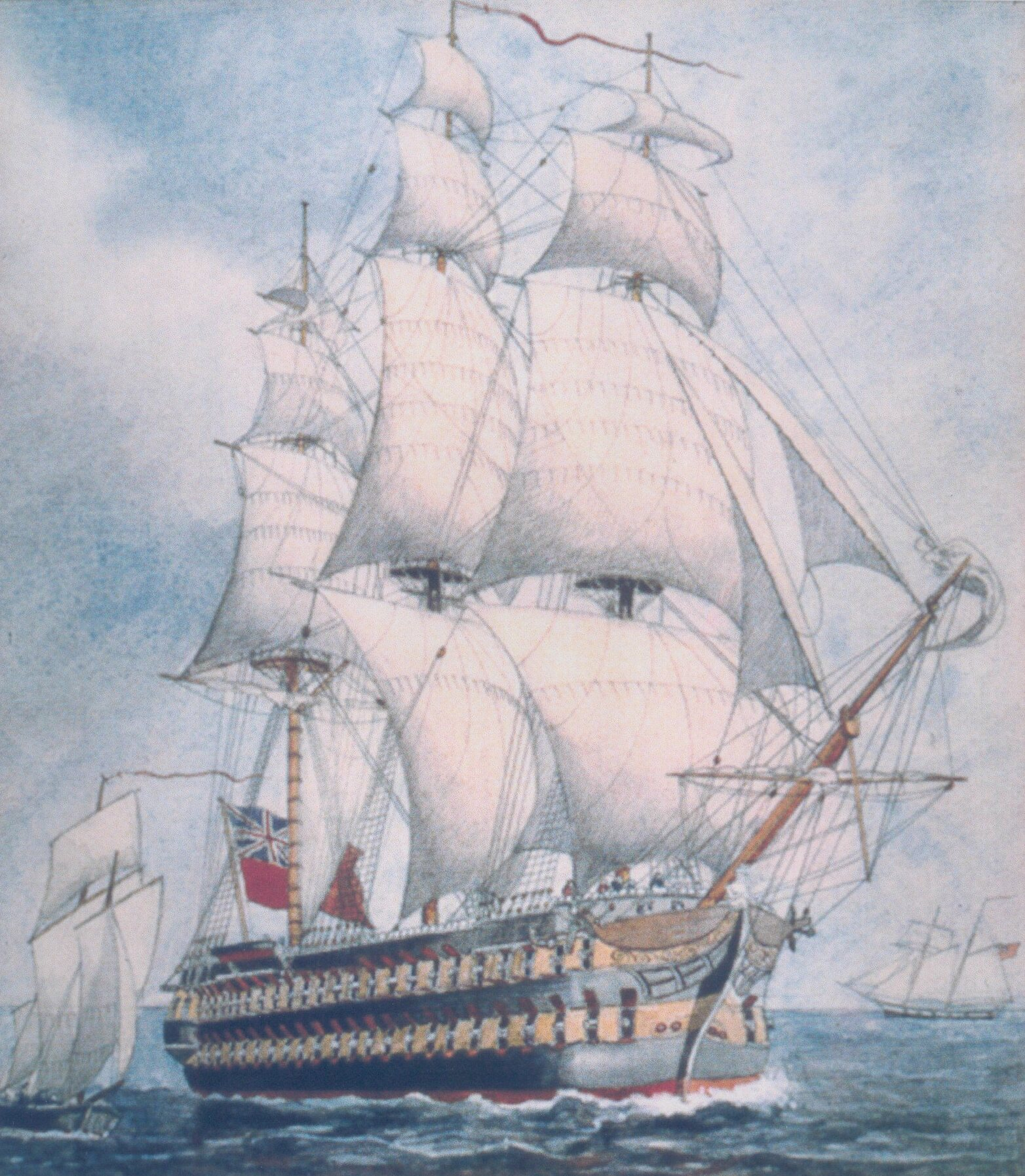
Although the Americans successfully defended Fort Erie, the launch of the first-rate ship of the line HMS St Lawrence in Lake Ontario prompted the Major General George Izard to abandon it in November 1814.

On 15 October, the British had launched the first-rate ship of the line HMS St Lawrence on Lake Ontario, and Chauncey's squadron promptly withdrew into Sackett's Harbor. It was no longer possible for the Americans to move supplies to the Niagara front, except by crude roads which would be unusable during the late autumn and winter. At the same time, the British were able to reinforce and resupply their troops on the Niagara. Izard wrote to the Secretary of War (James Monroe) "At the head of the most efficient army the United States have possessed during this war, much must be expected of me; and yet I can discern no object which can be achieved at this point worthy of the risk which will attend its attempt."

At Brown's request, he and his division were transferred to Sackett's Harbor to protect the vital naval base. (The British contemplated making an attack there, but could not transport the necessary troops up the St. Lawrence before winter set in.) Izard, who was short of supplies, decided to abandon Fort Erie and go into winter quarters in New York state with the remainder of the army. On 5 November, the Americans set mines and demolished the fort before retiring across the river. This allowed the British to go into winter quarters also, which spared them losses from the winter weather. Izard himself asked for sick leave and tendered his resignation, which was refused. Many officers (including Brown) accused Izard of cowardice, and he was nearly court-martialled as a result, but because of his military expertise and excellent service record, he was moved to a civil position and was eventually made Governor of Arkansas.

When the British returned to the site of Fort Erie, they chose not to rebuild the fort due to lack of funds and merely constructed makeshift quarters until they completely abandoned the fort in 1821 and demolished it from 1823 onwards. On several occasions, especially after his own failed assault on Fort Erie, General Drummond blamed his troops for lack of spirit or misbehaviour in action, but most historians consider that Drummond himself planned poorly and took insufficient care to maintain his troops' health and morale.

== Legacy ==
Nine active regular infantry battalions of the United States Army (1-2 Inf, 2-2 Inf, 1-3 Inf, 2-3 Inf, 4-3 Inf, 1-5 Inf, 2-5 Inf, 1-6 Inf and 2-6 Inf) perpetuate the lineages of American units (the old 1st, 9th, 11th, 19th, 21st, 22nd, 23rd and 25th Infantry Regiments) that were present during the siege.

Eight line regiments of the British Army, the 6th, 8th (Kings), 41st, 82nd, 89th, 100th, 103rd and 104th (New Brunswick) Regiments of Foot, were awarded the "Niagara" Battle Honour, to commemorate service on the Niagara peninsula during the summer of 1814. The modern descendant units of the 6th, 8th (Kings), 41st, 82nd and 89th regiments within the British Army are, respectively: The Royal Regiment of Fusiliers, the Duke of Lancaster's Regiment (also the successor regiment to the 82nd Regiment), the Royal Welsh Regiment, and the Royal Irish Regiment. Within the Canadian Army, the Royal New Brunswick Regiment officially commemorates the 104th (New Brunswick) Regiment of Foot and also carries the "Niagara" Battle Honour.

The "Niagara" Battle Honour was also awarded to the Glengarry Light Infantry Fencibles, a unit of the British Army recruited in Upper Canada, and to the Battalion of Incorporated Militia of Upper Canada. Within the modern Canadian army, these units are commemorated and perpetuated, in the case of the Glengarry Fencibles, by the Stormont, Dundas and Glengarry Highlanders and, in the case of the Incorporated Militia Battalion, by four Ontario-based regiments: The Lincoln and Welland Regiment, the Queen's York Rangers, the Brockville Rifles and the Princess of Wales Own Regiment.

== Cited external links ==
- Cruikshank, Ernest A. "The Documentary History of the campaign upon the Niagara frontier. Part 1-2". Lundy's Lane Historical Society. Archived from the original on May 27, 2011.

== Other external links ==
- http://warof1812.ca/forterie.htm
- http://members.tripod.com/~war1812/allbat.html
- https://web.archive.org/web/20050208082626/http://www.galafilm.com/1812/e/locations/niagara.html
