= Old Fort Erie =

Historic fortification in Ontario, Canada

Fort Erie National Historic Site of Canada
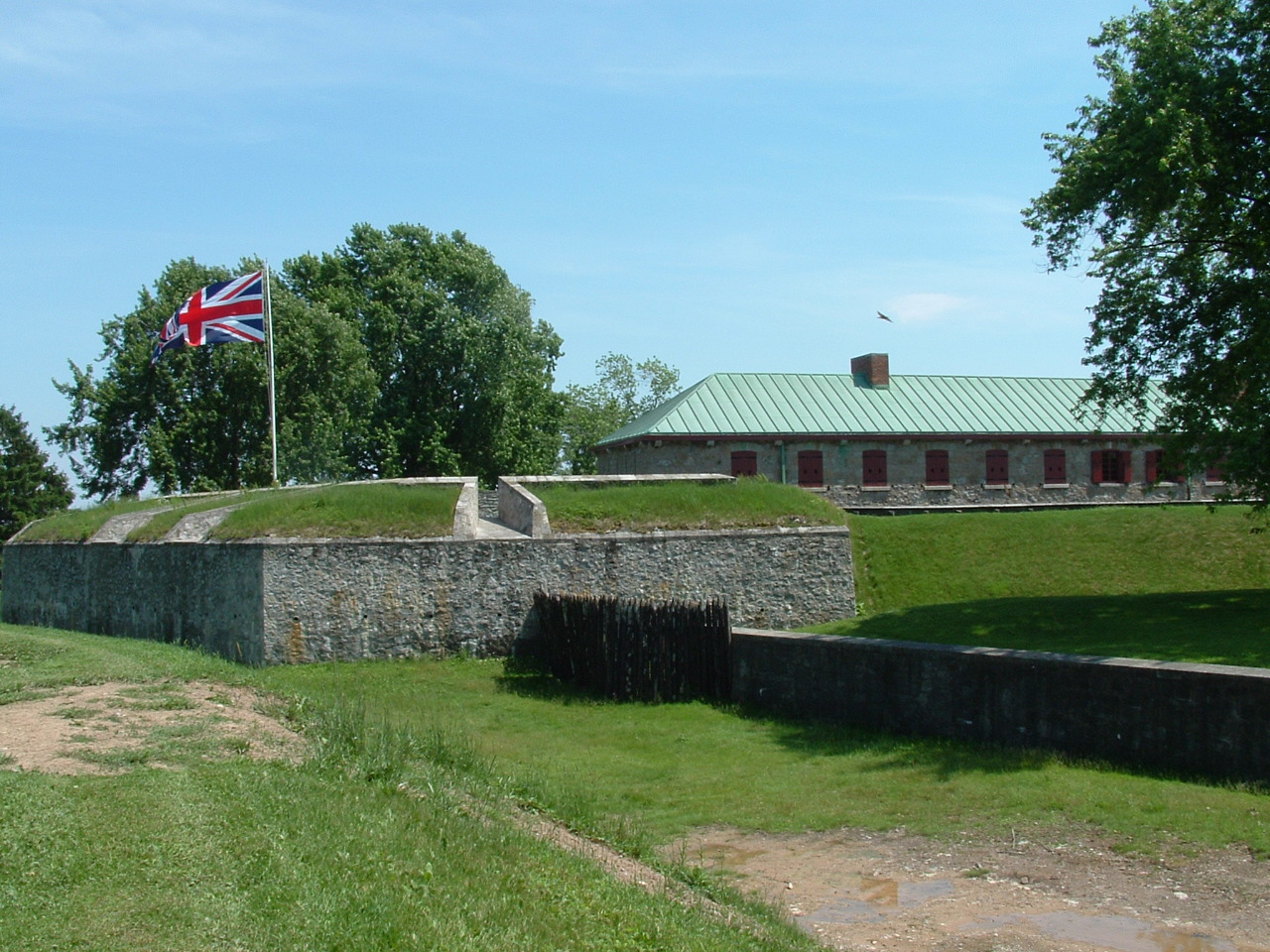

- Location within Southern Ontario
- 42°53′35.70″N 78°55′25.74″W
- Location: 350 Lakeshore Road; Fort Erie, Ontario, Canada; L2A 1B1

History
- Built: 1764 (original fort); 1805–1808 (present fort)
- Original use: Military fort

Site notes
- Current use: Living museum
- Governing body: Niagara Parks Commission

National Historic Site of Canada
- Designated: 28 May 1933

Old Fort Erie, also known as Fort Erie, or the Fort Erie National Historic Site of Canada, was the first British fort to be constructed as part of a network developed after the Seven Years' War (known as "the French and Indian War" in the colonies) was concluded by the Treaty of Paris (1763), at which time France ceded its territories east of the Mississippi River (all of New France) to Great Britain. The installation is located on the southern edge of what is now the Town of Fort Erie, Ontario, directly across the Niagara River from Buffalo, New York, United States.

The fort and surrounding battlefield are owned and operated by the Niagara Parks Commission, a self-funded agency of the Ontario provincial government.

== History ==
The British established control of their new territory by occupying the French forts and by constructing a line of communications along the Niagara River and Upper Great Lakes. The original fort, built in 1764, was located on the Niagara River's edge below the present fort (parking lot on Lakeshore Road). It served as a supply depot and a port for ships transporting merchandise, troops and passengers via Lake Erie to the Upper Great Lakes. In 1795, the fort consisted of some wooden blockhouses surrounded by a wooden palisade (dropped from the plan was a magazine, officer's quarters, storehouses and guard house). Provisions were stored inside the fort, and just outside was a large wooden magazine (original plans were to have it built inside the fort), as well as houses for workmen. The fort was damaged by winter storms and in 1803, plans were made for a new fort on the higher ground behind the original. It was larger and made of flintstone but was not quite finished at the start of the War of 1812.

The Onondaga Limestone used in the walls of Old Fort Erie. Note the black flint nodules in the blocks

The fort served as a supply base for British troops, United Empire Loyalists Rangers, and allied Iroquois warriors during the American Revolution. The little fort at the water's edge suffered considerable damage due to continuous winter storms. In 1803, planning was authorized for a new Fort Erie on the heights behind the original post. The new fort was made more formidable as it was constructed of the Onondaga limestone that was readily available in the area. The limestone was likely sourced from the quarry sites of the Peace Bridge site which was also an ancient source of limestone and flint for indigenous peoples in the area.

=== War of 1812 (1812–1815) ===
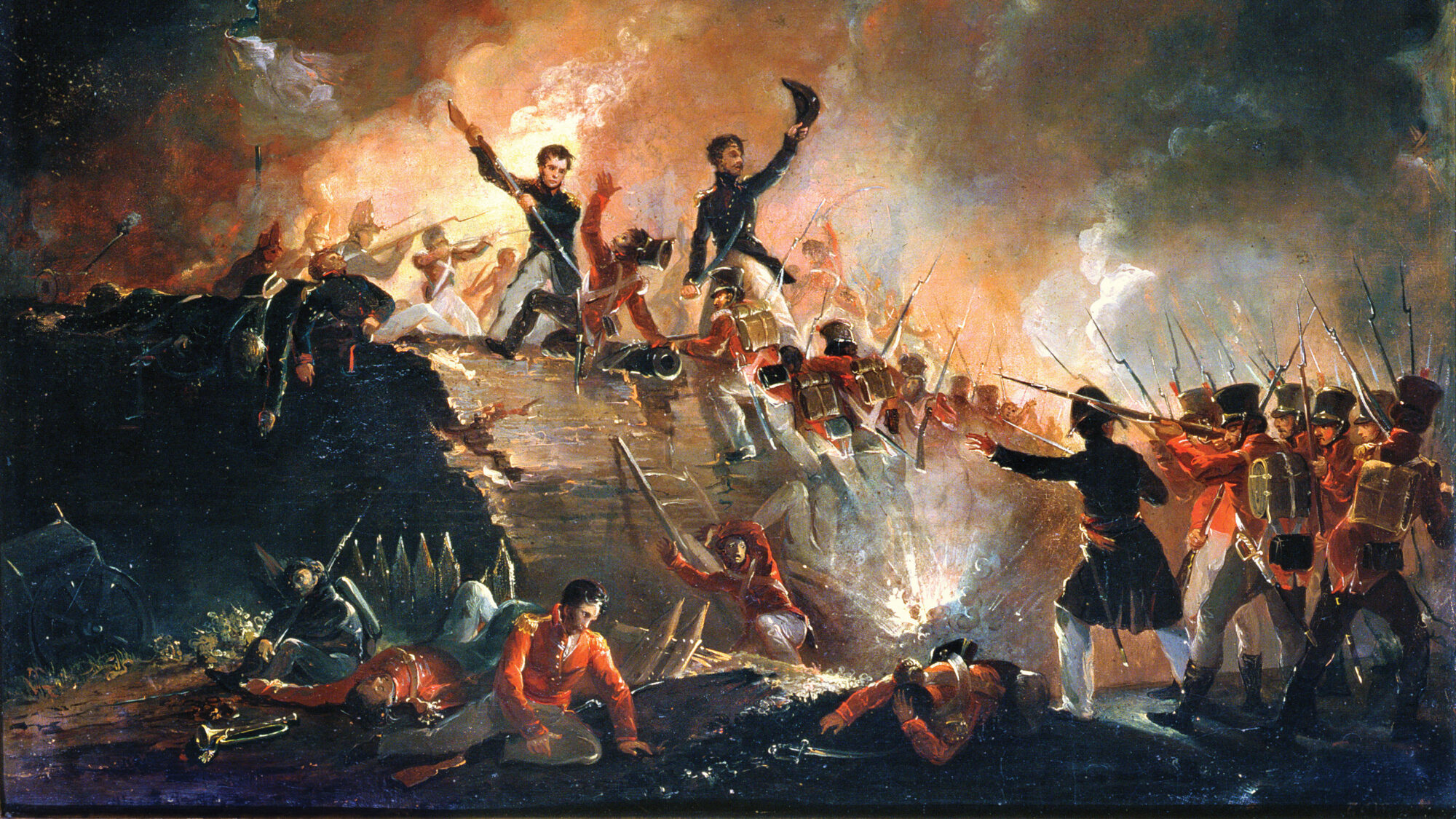
1840 painting of the siege of Fort Erie

Fort Erie was the site of the bloodiest battles during the War of 1812. This new fort was unfinished when the United States declared war on 18 June 1812. Part of the garrison of Fort Erie fought at the Battle of Frenchman's Creek against an American attack in November 1812. In 1813, Fort Erie was held for a period by U.S. forces and then abandoned on 9 June 1813. The fort had been partially dismantled by the small garrison of British troops and Canadian Militia as they withdrew.

British reoccupation followed American withdrawal from the area in December 1813. The British attempted to rebuild the fort. On 3 July 1814 another American force landed nearby and again captured Fort Erie. The U.S. Army used the fort as a supply base and expanded its size, adding to defensive fortifications. At the end of July, after the Battles of Chippawa and Lundy's Lane, the American army withdrew to Fort Erie. They were besieged by the British for an extended period. In the early hours of 15 August 1814, the British launched a four-pronged attack against the fortifications. A well-prepared American defence and an explosion in the fort's Northeast Bastion led to the attack being repulsed, with the attackers suffering 1,000 casualties.

An American sortie on 17 September captured two of the British batteries and the American troops were able to spike the guns of one battery before being driven back to the fort. In the American sortie, NY Militia Brigadier General Davis died at the front of his column. Colonel Gibson was cut down as well. Brevet Lieutenant Colonel Eleazer D. Wood was also killed leading this sortie. Shortly afterward, the British lifted the siege and retired to positions to the north at Chippawa. After an unsuccessful American attack at Cook's Mills, west of Chippawa, news reached the American forces that the eastern seaboard of the U.S. was under attack. On 5 November 1814, with winter approaching, the Americans destroyed the fort and withdrew to Buffalo.

=== Mid-19th century (1814–1866) ===
The Treaty of Ghent was signed 24 December 1814, ending the War of 1812. Fearing further American attacks, the British continued to occupy the ruined fort until 1823. Some of the stones from the fort were incorporated into the construction of St. Paul's Anglican Church in 1824. It was rebuilt after fire and explosion in 1892. Today the church is adjacent to the later constructed Niagara Parkway 3 km (1.9 mi) north of the fort.

The town of Fort Erie began to develop north of the fort when a rail terminus and station were constructed to the area.

=== Fenian Raids (1866) ===
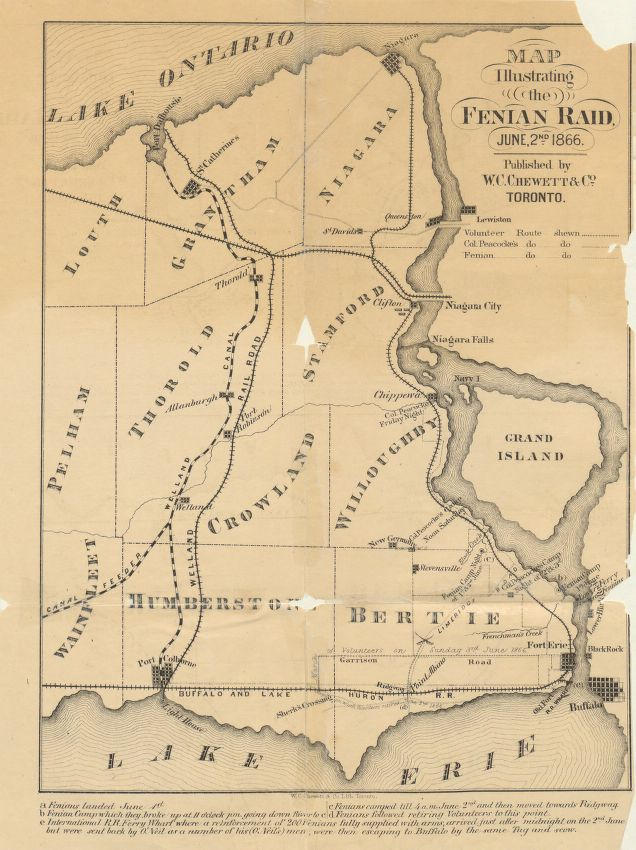
Map depicting the routes taken by the Canadian Militia, and the Fenians during the Fenian Raids into the Province of Canada.

The Fenians, Irish-American veterans of the American Civil War demanding independence from Britain for Ireland, mounted several raids on Upper Canada. One was quite large, attacking Fort Erie on 1 June 1866 after crossing the Niagara River with a large force of 1,000 to 1500 men (depending on the source of the report). The Fenians occupied the town and demanded food and horses. The only payment they could offer were Fenian bonds, which the townspeople would not accept. The Fenians cut the telegraph wires and tore up some railway tracks.

Afterwards, they marched to Chippewa and the next day to Ridgeway, where they fought the Battle of Ridgeway, a series of skirmishes with the Canadian militia. The Fenians returned to Fort Erie, where they defeated a small force of the Canadian militia.

Unable to get reinforcements from across the river, which was guarded by the Americans, and worried about the large force of British and militia that was approaching, the Fenian commander decided to retreat to the US. Some of his troops deserted. Approximately 850 surrendered to forces of the American navy. This was the last notable Fenian raid on Upper Canada.

=== Recent history (1866–present) ===
The fort lay vacant with old parts of the barracks, walls and mill still standing. It was eventually settled by military pensioners and others until it was sold to the Niagara Parks Commission in 1901.

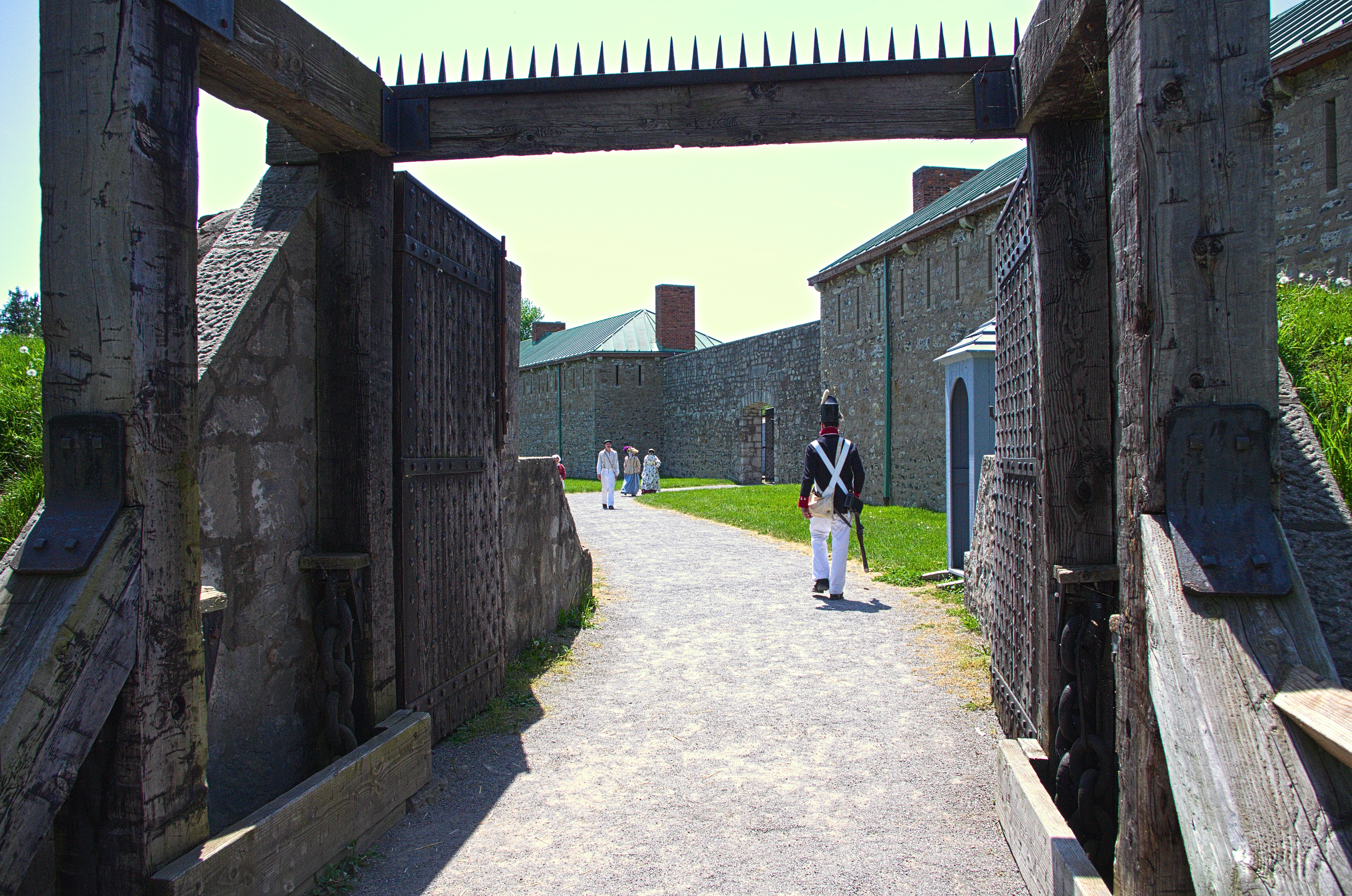
Entrance to the Fort, with a re-enactor dressed as an American soldier in the background. The fort is operated as a living museum, administered by the Niagara Parks Commission.

The reconstruction of the fort was started in 1937 (featuring only the walls and two barracks). The reconstruction was jointly sponsored by the Provincial and Federal governments and the Niagara Parks Commission, and was a way to invest in a long term project while providing employment during the Depression. The fort was restored to the 1812-1814 period and officially reopened on 1 July 1939. During the restoration, a mass grave of 150 British and 3 American soldiers was uncovered. A monument was erected at this site, in the ruins, in 1904.

The Niagara Parkway was constructed starting at Fort Erie and continues 56 km (35 mi) north to Lake Ontario. Sir Winston Churchill was quoted saying that the parkway was "the prettiest Sunday drive in the world." Each year, during the second weekend of August, hundreds of historical re-enactment enthusiasts come together to re-enact the siege of Fort Erie.

On 28 June 1985 Canada Post issued 'Fort Erie, Ont.' one of the 20 stamps in the "Forts Across Canada Series" (1983 & 1985). The stamps are perforated 12½ x 13 and were printed by Ashton-Potter Limited based on the designs by Rolf P. Harder.

== Affiliations ==
The Museum is affiliated with: CMA, CHIN, and Virtual Museum of Canada.

== See also ==
- Fort George
- Fort Meigs
- Fort Mississauga
- List of forts
