= Battle of Cook's Mills =

1814 battle of the War of 1812

Coordinates: 42.997895°N 79.174913°W

- Part of the War of 1812
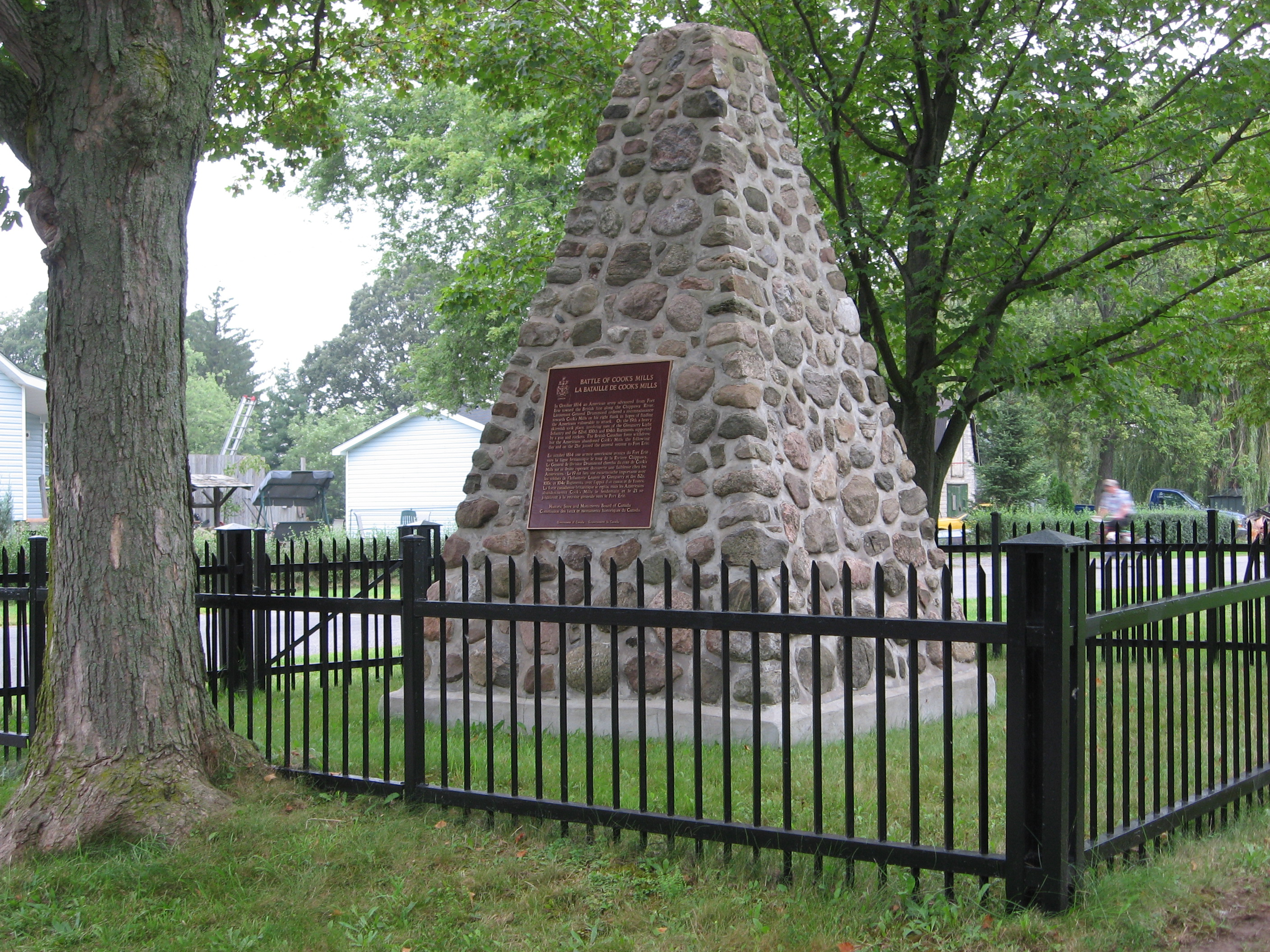
- The monument commemorating the battle.
Date	19 October 1814
Location	Cooks Mills, Upper Canada, within present-day Welland, Ontario
Result	American victory

Belligerents
United Kingdom; Upper Canada	United States

Commanders and leaders
(United Kingdom of Great Britain and Ireland) Christopher Myers	(United States) George Izard (United States) Daniel Bissell

Strength
750; 1 cannon 6 Congreve rockets	1,200

Casualties and losses
1 dead, 35 wounded	12 dead, 55 wounded

National Historic Site of Canada
- Official name: Battle of Cook's Mills National Historic Site of Canada
- Designated: 1921

The Battle of Cook's Mills was the last engagement between U.S. and British armies in the Niagara, and the penultimate engagement (followed by the Battle of Malcolm's Mills) on Canadian soil during the War of 1812. After a battle lasting less than an hour, American forces out-maneuvered the British column, and later destroyed all grain found in the mill.

== Background ==
General Gordon Drummond had lifted the Siege of Fort Erie on 21 September 1814, and withdrew to a strong defensive position at Fort Chippawa on the north bank of Chippawa Creek. An American division under Major General George Izard had marched overland from Plattsburgh, New York to reinforce the Americans at Fort Erie (commanded by Major General Jacob Brown). Being the senior Major General, Izard took command of the combined force. The more aggressive Brown wished to attack Drummond immediately, with the combined force numbering 6,300. Izard chose not to risk the casualties of attacking a strong defensive position. Angered at Izard's lack of action, Brown left with his division (half the army's strength) and marched to Sacketts Harbor, New York, where a British attack was feared.

Izard finally marched north to Chippawa Creek. The creek was unfordable, and the bridge had been destroyed. During 16 October, his artillery exchanged fire with the British, without effect.

== Battle ==
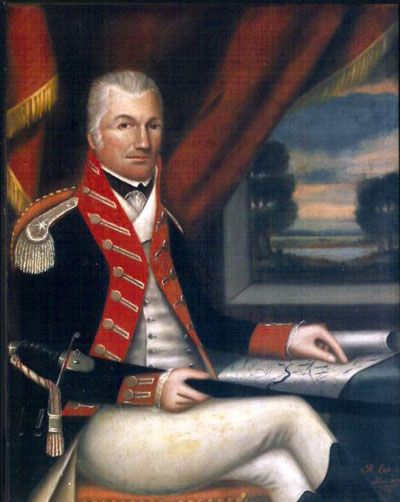
A detachment under Brig Gen Daniel Bissell was dispatched to Cooks Mills in an effort to deprive the British of their chief source of flour.

Attempting to deprive the British of their chief source of flour, Izard sent a brigade of about 1,200 men, consisting of the 5th, 14th, 15th and 16th U.S. Infantry with some detachments of riflemen and U.S. Dragoons under Brigadier General Daniel Bissell, to take Cooks Mills on Lyon's Creek in Crowland township. In response, Drummond dispatched about 750 men (the 6th Regiment, the Glengarry Light Infantry and the flank companies of the 104th Regiment, with a 6-pounder gun and a Congreve rocket detachment) under Colonel Christopher Myers to reconnoitre the American force.

On the morning of 19 October, Myers came into contact with the American picket just east of the mills. A half-hour fight ensued, but the Americans could not be lured from the cover of the woods. Observing American soldiers moving through the trees on his right and left, Myers feared he was being out-manoeuvred. He eventually ordered an orderly retreat. The Americans pursued his column nearly to their camp at the Lyon's Creek settlement. Returning to Cooks Mills, the Americans destroyed all the grain found in the mill. Their dead, approximately a dozen soldiers, were interred in shallow pits at the Yokom farmhouse near the mills. The next day they withdrew to their camp at Black Creek.

== Aftermath ==
The battle showed the effects of Izard's well trained troops. Despite this minor victory, it became apparent that Drummond was not going to move from his defences. Izard also heard that British ships dominated Lake Ontario, and any American advance risked being cut off by a landing in its rear. He withdrew to Fort Erie. The British loss of 200 bushels of wheat was offset when several American provision boats crossed the Niagara unaware of Izard's retreat and fell into British hands.

Izard later destroyed Fort Erie and returned to the U.S. side of the river. Drummond moved to the remains of the fort but chose not to rebuild it, and the fighting along the Niagara Frontier came to an end.

The site of the battle was designated a National Historic Site in 1921, and is a unit of the national park system. A federal cairn were erected in 1923, and the current plaque replaced the original on the cairn in 1977. Bicentennial commemorations in 2014 included construction of a visitors’ plaza and the unveiling of interpretive markers.

Eight active regular battalions of the United States Army (1-2 Inf, 2-2 Inf, 1-3 Inf, 2-3 Inf, 4-3 Inf, 1-4 Inf, 2-4 Inf and 3-4 Inf) perpetuate the lineages of a number of American infantry regiments (the old 5th, 14th and 16th Infantry Regiments) that took part in the battle.

== Sources ==
- Heidler, David; Heidler, Jeanne, editors Encyclopedia of the War of 1812
- War of 1812 site
