= Capture of Fort Erie =

1814 battle of the War of 1812

Coordinates: 42.893351°N 78.923969°W

- Part of the War of 1812
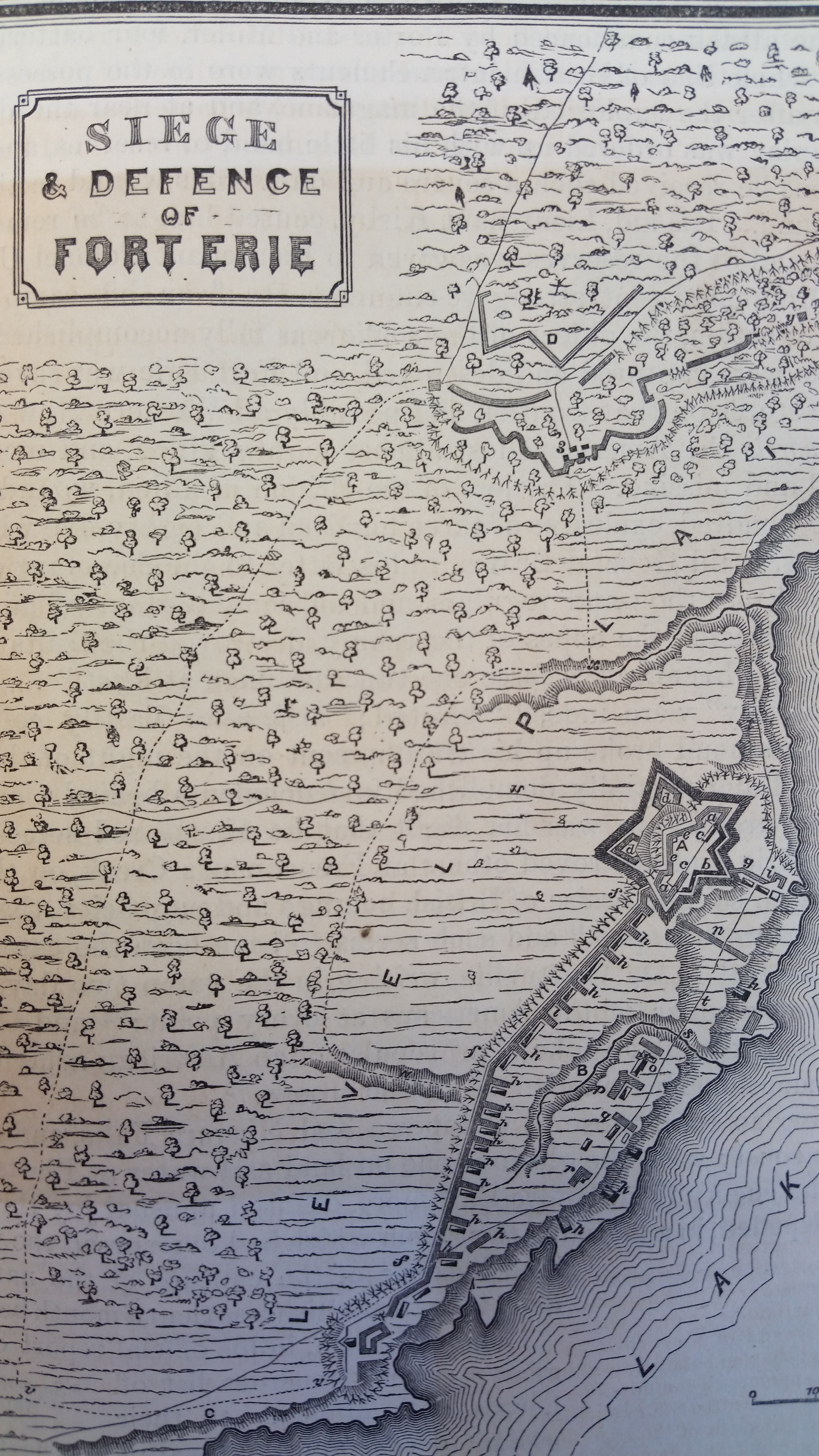
- Map of Fort Erie during the War of 1812
Date	July 3, 1814
Location	Fort Erie, Upper Canada (present-day Ontario)
Result	American victory

Belligerents
United Kingdom	United States

Commanders and leaders
Thomas Buck (surrendered)	Jacob Brown; Winfield Scott

Strength
137	2,786

Casualties and losses
All surrendered	Less than 10

The Capture of Fort Erie by American forces in 1814 was a battle in the War of 1812 between the United Kingdom and the United States. The British garrison was outnumbered but surrendered prematurely, in the view of British commanders.

== Background ==
The United States shared a long border with British North America (present-day Canada) in 1814. During the war, the Americans launched several invasions into Upper Canada (present-day Ontario). One section of the border where this was easiest (because of communications and locally available supplies) was along the Niagara River. Fort Erie was the British post at the head of the river, near its source in Lake Erie.

In 1812, two American attempts to capture Fort Erie were bungled by Brigadier General Alexander Smyth. Bad weather or poor administration foiled the American efforts to cross the river.

In 1813, the Americans won the Battle of Fort George at the northern end of the Niagara River. The British abandoned the Niagara frontier and allowed Fort Erie to fall into American hands without a fight. The Americans failed to follow up their victory, and later in the year they withdrew most of their soldiers from the Niagara to furnish an ill-fated attack on Montreal. This allowed the British to recover their positions and to mount raids which led to the Capture of Fort Niagara and the devastation of large parts of the American side of the Niagara River.

== Battle ==
For 1814, a new invasion of Upper Canada was planned under the command of Major General Jacob Brown. Originally aimed at Kingston on Lake Ontario, it was switched to the Niagara because British ships controlled Lake Ontario for the first six months of 1814.

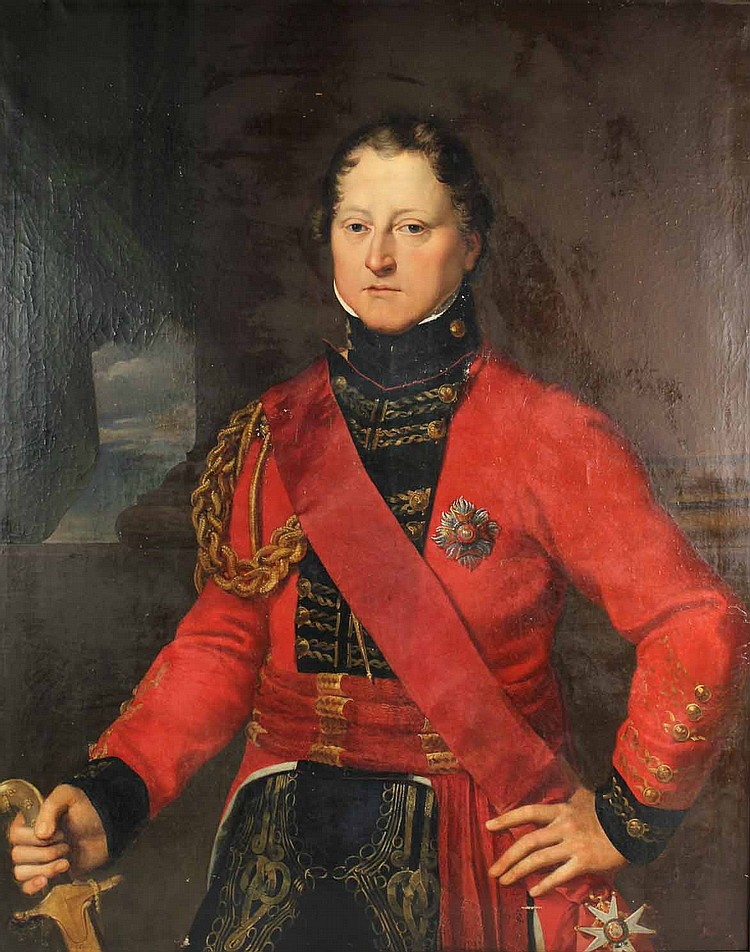
With only 137 British soldiers at Fort Erie, Lieutenant General Gordon Drummond hoped they could at least afford him the time to concentrate his own forces against the Americans.

Because American troops were already concentrated at Buffalo and Black Rock, the attack was to be launched across the southern part of the Niagara frontier. Fort Erie was the first objective that stood in the way, which required its capture. Lieutenant General Gordon Drummond, the British commander in Upper Canada, hoped that the garrison at Fort Erie could at least buy him enough time against the American invasion to concentrate his forces. Major Thomas Buck was given command of the fort with a garrison of 137 British soldiers.

Brown's force crossed into Canada on July 3. Brigadier General Winfield Scott landed a mile and a half (3 km) north of the fort with a brigade of regulars while it was still dark. Another brigade under Eleazar Wheelock Ripley crossed the head of the river to the south of the fort, although they were delayed by fog. Meanwhile, New York militia demonstrated opposite Chippawa to distract the British troops in the area.

As Scott's and Ripley's forces approached Fort Erie, Buck fired only a few shots at the Americans from the fort's cannon and then surrendered. The Americans had captured an important fort at little cost. The fort's garrison had bought the British little time and Buck was later court martialled for his hasty surrender.

== Aftermath ==
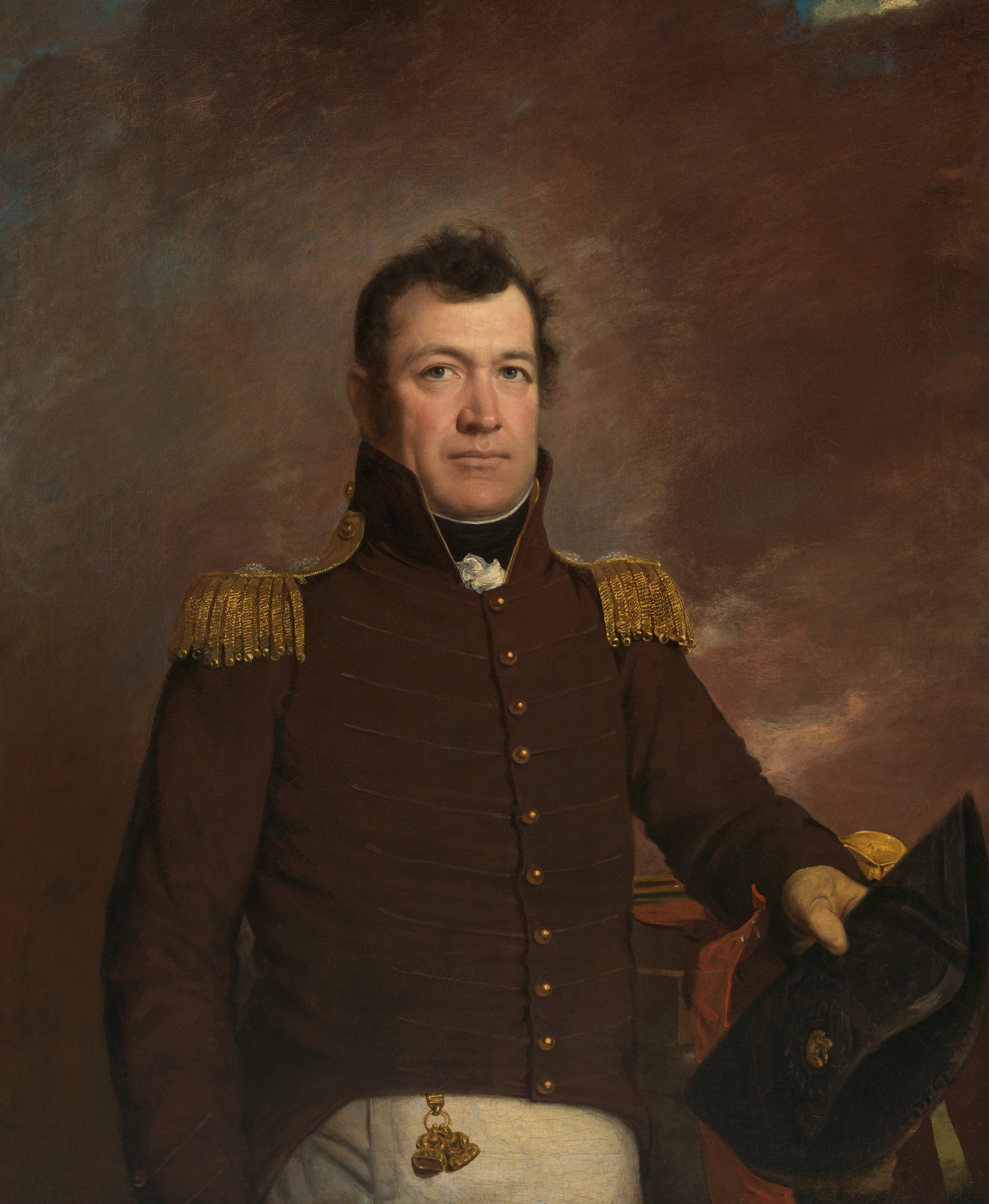
Following the capture of Fort Erie, Major General Jacob Brown was able to use it as a supply base for further incursions into Upper Canada.

From their new base at Fort Erie, Brown next marched up the Niagara River and met the British at the Battle of Chippawa. The British commander at Chippawa, Major General Phineas Riall, believed that the garrison of Fort Erie was still holding out, which contributed to his decision to launch a hasty and ill-fated attack.

Following the Battle of Lundy's Lane in July, British forces under the command of Gordon Drummond advanced and unsuccessfully besieged the fort. However, American commanders decided to abandon the fort, which was evacuated and blown up in November 1814.

== Sources ==
- John R. Elting, Amateurs to Arms (Da Capo Press, New York, 1995, ISBN 0-306-80653-3)
- Joseph Whitehorne, While Washington Burned: The Battle for Fort Erie 1814 (1993)

== See also ==
- Siege of Fort Erie
