= 104th =

104th is the ordinal form of the number 104. 104th or One hundred and fourth may also refer to:

- A fraction, 1/104, equal to one of 104 equal parts

== Geography ==
- 104th meridian east, a line of longitude
- 104th meridian west, a line of longitude
- 104th Street (disambiguation)

== Military ==
- 104th Brigade (disambiguation)
- 104th Division (disambiguation)
- 104th Regiment (disambiguation)

== See also ==
- April 14, 104th day of the year in a standard year
