= 104th Division =

104th Division may refer to:

- 104th Division (1st Formation) (People's Republic of China), 1948–1951
- 104th Division (2nd Formation) (People's Republic of China), 1951–1955
- 104th Jäger Division, Wehrmacht, Germany
- 104th Division (Imperial Japanese Army)
- 104th Infantry Division "Mantova", Italy
- 104th Guards Airborne Division, Russia/Soviet Union, previously the 104th Guards Rifle Division, currently the 104th Air Assault Division
- 104th Rifle Division, Soviet Union
- 104th Infantry Division (United States)

== See also ==
- List of military divisions by number
- 104th Brigade (disambiguation)
- 104th Regiment (disambiguation)
- 104th (disambiguation)
