= 104th Regiment of Foot (disambiguation) =

The 104th Regiment of Foot was a regiment raised by the East India Company and placed on the British establishment as in 1862.

104th Regiment of Foot may also refer to:

- 104th Regiment of Foot (King's Volunteers), raised in 1761
- 104th Regiment of Foot (1782)
- 104th Regiment of Foot (Royal Manchester Volunteers), raised in 1794
- 104th (New Brunswick) Regiment of Foot, raised in Canada and placed on the British establishment in 1810

== See also ==
- 104th Regiment (disambiguation)
