= Alexander Lindsay (East India Company officer) =

Scottish army officer in the East India Company

General Sir Alexander Lindsay KCB
- Born: 14 January 1785
- Died: 22 January 1872 (aged 87)
- Spouse: Flora Loudon Mackenzie
- Military career
- Allegiance: (Kingdom of Great Britain) Great Britain; East India Company
- Branch: British Army; Bengal Army
- Service years: 1795-1872 (British Army); 1804-1872 (Bengal Army)
- Rank: Lieutenant (British Army); General (Bengal Army)
- Units: 104th Regiment of Foot (1795-1872); Bengal Artillery (1804-1872)
- Conflicts: Anglo-Nepalese War (1814-16); Third Anglo-Maratha War (1817-18); First Anglo-Burmese War (1824-26)

General Sir Alexander Lindsay KCB (14 January 1785 – 22 January 1872) was an officer in both the British and East India Company armies. Commissioned into the British Army at the age of nine, he was placed on half-pay after the 104th Regiment of Foot (Royal Manchester Volunteers) was disbanded in 1795.

After passing out from the Royal Military Academy, Woolwich, Lindsay joined the Bengal Army of the East India Company as an artillery officer in 1804. He served in a number of sieges and on campaign in Bundelkhand before joining David Ochterlony's army in the 1814–16 Anglo-Nepalese War, in which he was wounded in the hand and leg. Lindsay recovered to fight in the 1817–18 Third Anglo-Maratha War and later had responsibility for telegraphs and gunpowder manufacture in part of Bengal. He commanded the artillery of Joseph Wanton Morrison's division during the 1824–26 First Anglo-Burmese War. Lindsay was promoted to major-general in 1838, to lieutenant-general in 1851 and to general in 1859. His general's commission was transferred to the British Army when the East India Company armies were absorbed in the 1860s. Because of this he was in the unusual position of holding two British Army commissions, one as a lieutenant (from his service in the 104th Regiment) and one as a general.

== Early life ==
Alexander Lindsay was born on 14 January 1785, the second son of Ann and James Smyth Lindsay of the Dowhill branch of the Lindsay family. His elder brother was Colonel Martin Lindsay, who commanded the 78th (Highlanders) Regiment of Foot from 1819 to 1837. On 9 January 1795, at the age of nine, Alexander Lindsay was appointed an ensign in Meyrick's Independent Company of Foot of the British Army. He transferred to the 104th Regiment of Foot (Royal Manchester Volunteers) on 3 March 1795 and at the same time was promoted to the rank of lieutenant. The regiment was on garrison in Ireland but army inspections found it to be failing to reach minimum standards and it was disbanded towards the end of 1795. Upon its disbandment Lindsay was transferred, for administrative purposes, into a previous 104th Regiment, that had been disbanded in 1783. Lindsay would remain a half-pay lieutenant in the British Army for the rest of his life.

== East India Company career ==
=== Early roles ===
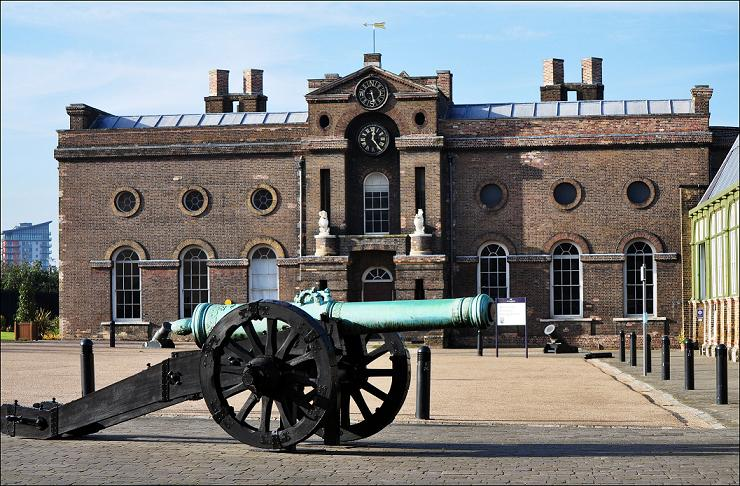
The Old Royal Military Academy in Woolwich, where Lindsay was taught.

Lindsay studied at the Royal Military Academy, Woolwich, from January 1800. The academy primarily trained engineer and artillery officers for the British Army but during this period around 40% of places were allocated to candidates for commissions in the presidency armies of the East India Company. Lindsay passed out in February 1804 and joined the East India Company's Bengal Army as a first lieutenant of artillery on 14 August 1804. Lindsay first served with the Company's garrison at Calcutta but was posted out on 15 March 1805 for duty at Cawnpore (modern Kanpur), arriving there in July.

In September Lindsay was attached to a company of artillery serving in a campaign against the Jat Rana of Gohad, Kirat Singh. Gohad had been disputed between Singh and the Maratha Empire. It had been regained by Singh with the assistance of East India Company troops during the Second Anglo-Maratha War (1803-1805) but had been granted to Maratha leader Daulat Rao Sindhia in the subsequent peace treaty. Singh refused to vacate his territory and the Company acted to forcibly evict him. Lindsay served with the foot artillery at the February 1806 siege of Gohad Fort. The artillery succeeded in breaching the fort's walls, allowing the infantry to take the defences by assault. During the remainder of the campaign the artillery was not required and Lindsay was sent to Agra and then Cawnpore, arriving there in June. The Company forces were victorious; Singh was deposed but given new territory as Rana of Dholpur.

Lindsay was afterwards posted to command a detachment of four 6-pounder artillery pieces at Lucknow. He was promoted to captain-lieutenant on 28 February 1806 and given command of a company at Agra in October. Lindsay deployed with his unit to a campaign in Allyghur district (modern Aligarh), part of the 1807-1808 campaign against Gopal Singh in the Bundelkhand region. Lindsay took part in the siege of Cummonah (modern Kamona, Uttar Pradesh), where the East India Company's infantry suffered heavy losses in an attempted storming. Lindsay's artillery was afterwards required to continue a month-long bombardment before the fort surrendered. The army proceeded to attack another fort in the district at Gunnowrie (modern Ginauri, to the north of Shikarpur, Bulandshahr) which surrendered after a two-week siege. Lindsay returned to Agra in January 1808.

In July 1808 Lindsay commanded five companies of Indian infantry and two 6-pounder cannon in an expedition against some minor forts in Candoulee (modern Kandali, Uttar Pradesh). He succeeded in capturing the forts. Lindsay was posted to Muttra (modern Mathura) in November 1808 to command a detachment of eight 6-pounders. He was posted to Futtehghur (modern Fatehgarh) in October 1809 to command the artillery there. Lindsay was posted to the Bengal Artillery's headquarters at Dum Dum on 1 January 1813.

=== Anglo-Nepalese War ===
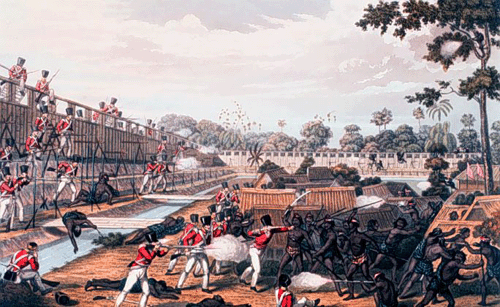
British troops attack a stockade during the Anglo-Burmese War

Lindsay was promoted to captain on 26 March 1813. He was appointed to command an artillery company and joined Major-General Bennett Marlay's division for the 1814 campaign of the Anglo-Nepalese War. Marlay's force entered the Nepalese Terai in November but otherwise carried out no significant action before it returned to the Dinapur Cantonment in May 1815. Lindsay remained with a detachment of troops left to guard the frontier.

The campaign was renewed in the following season with Major-General David Ochterlony leading a force that was three times the size of Marlay's. Lindsay was assigned to one of the three columns of Ochterlony's army, the Dinapur Division led by Brigadier-General William Kelly. Lindsay commanded the artillery of that column and also acted as its field engineer, there being no engineers assigned to it. Lindsay led a reconnaissance to Hurrechurpoor (Hariharpurgadhi) in February 1816 and selected a site for a battery to fire upon the Nepalese fort there. The British occupied the site, driving off a small Nepalese force, but faced a significant counter-attack by troops who sallied from the fort. The Nepalese were driven back in an eight-hour battle but the British suffered heavy casualties of 250 men killed or wounded. Lindsay was one of five officers wounded, being hit by a musket ball that shattered the forefinger and thumb of his right hand and continued into his right hip. In March 1816 a peace treaty was signed ending the war.

Lindsay was moved to Dinapur in May 1816 and to Allahabad in August. Lindsay had recovered sufficiently from his wounds by January 1817 to be put in command of an artillery train being assembled for an East India Company campaign again Daya Ram, the Zaminder of Hathras, who was in rebellion. Lindsay took part in the March 1817 Siege of Hathras during which the fortress was bombarded and captured. The territory was annexed to the Company's domains.

=== Anglo-Maratha War and senior roles ===
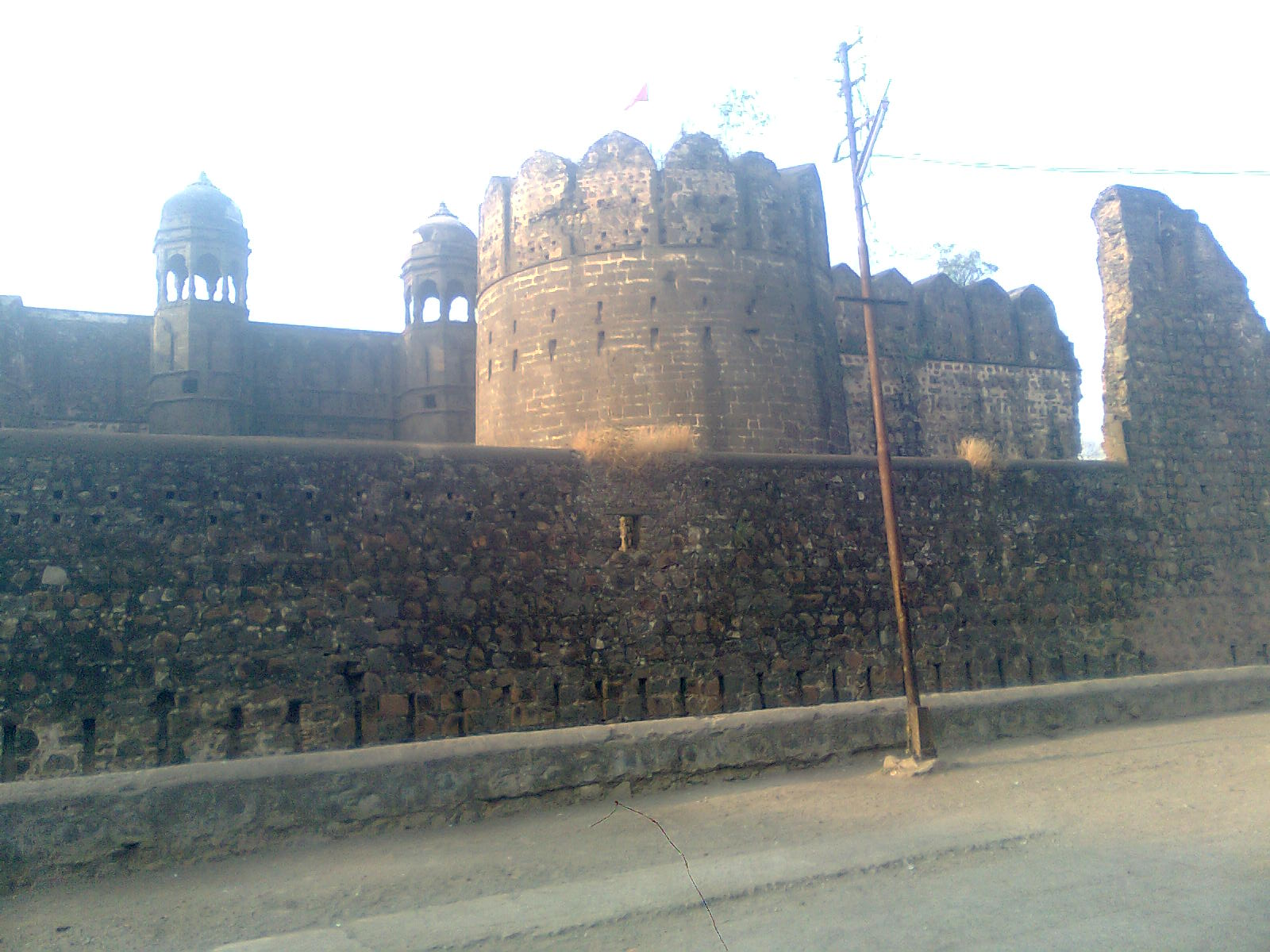
Malegaon Fort which was besieged in May 1818.

Lindsay was appointed superintendent of materials used for the manufacture of gun carriages and other equipment for the Bengal Presidency in September 1817. With the coming of the Third Anglo-Maratha War he obtained permission to join the army in the field. Lindsay commanded the artillery of the army's left division from 30 September. The division pursued the Marathas without success until a siege train arrived in February 1818 which allowed it to capture several forts. After the capture of Saugor (Sagar), Lindsay left the army and returned to Cawnpore to take up his appointment with the presidency in October 1818.

On 12 August 1819 Lindsay was appointed to the brevet rank of major and in November he was appointed as superintendent of telegraphs between Calcutta and Chunar. Lindsay married Flora Loudon Mackenzie, the daughter of a British Army officer, at Government House in Calcutta on 1 January 1820. The couple had no children. In October 1820 he became the Company's agent for the manufacture of gunpowder in Allahabad. Lindsay was promoted to lieutenant-colonel on 1 May 1824. He left his position at Allahabad in June and returned to Dum Dum before being appointed to command the artillery on the Burmese border.

During the 1824-26 First Anglo-Burmese War Lindsay commanded the artillery of Brigadier-General Joseph Wanton Morrison's division. The Army List of 1863 notes this was Lindsay's last period of wartime service. Lindsay was appointed a Companion of the Order of the Bath on 26 September 1831. He was promoted to colonel and colonel-commandant on 2 July 1835.

Lindsay received promotion to major-general in the Bengal Army on 28 June 1838 and to lieutenant-general on 11 November 1851. He was awarded the equivalent brevet rank in the British Army on 21 November 1851, the rank being local to the East Indies only. Lindsay was promoted to general in the Bengal Army on 11 September 1859.

== Return to the British Army and later life ==
When the presidency armies came into the control of the British government in 1860 (in the aftermath of the Indian Mutiny) Lindsay became colonel-commandant of the Bengal Artillery, an honorary, non-active service appointment. His appointment as colonel-commandant transferred to the Royal Artillery on 29 April 1862, being antedated to 2 July 1835. His general's commission was also transferred and his commission in the 104th not cancelled so Lindsay was in the unusual position of holding both a general's and lieutenant's commission in the British Army at the same time. He had continued to draw his British Army half-pay throughout and was listed twice in the Army List.

Lindsay was appointed a Knight Commander of the Order of the Bath on 9 November 1862. His wife died in 1863, and Lindsay died of bronchitis at home in Perth, Scotland, on 22 January 1872. Lindsay's nephew Alexander Hadden Lindsay also served in the Bengal Artillery and became a major-general in the British Army.

== Bibliography ==
- Baldry, W. Y.; White, A. S. (1922). "Disbanded Regiments. The New Brunswick Fencibles—afterwards the 104th Foot" (PDF). Journal of the Society for Army Historical Research. 1 (3): 90–92. ISSN 0037-9700. JSTOR 44231987.
- Biddulph, H. (1933). "The Era of Army Purchase". Journal of the Society for Army Historical Research. 12 (48): 221–233. ISSN 0037-9700. JSTOR 44221599.
- Bhanu, Dharma (1979). The Province of Agra: Its History and Administration. Concept Publishing Company.
- Chaurasia, R. S. (2004). History of the Marathas. Atlantic Publishers & Dist. ISBN 978-81-269-0394-8.
- Hart, Henry George (1872). Annual Army List. London: John Murray.
- Hart, Henry George (1863). The new army list, by H.G. Hart [afterw.] Hart's army list. [Quarterly]. London: John Murray.
- India Office Library (1969). British Drawings in the India Office Library. H.M. Stationery Office. ISBN 978-0-11-880416-5.
- Jaques, Tony (2007). Dictionary of Battles and Sieges: P-Z. Greenwood Publishing Group. ISBN 978-0-313-33539-6.
- Lindsay, Martin (1972). "The Indian Mutiny Letters of Lieutenant Alexander Hadden Lindsay, Bengal Horse Artillery". Journal of the Society for Army Historical Research. 50 (204): 200–220. ISSN 0037-9700. JSTOR 44225345.
- Mackenzie, Alexander (October 1888). "The Macleods of Raasay". The Celtic Magazine. 13 (156).
- Philippart, John (1826). The East India Military Calendar: Containing the Services of General and Field Officers of the Indian Army. Kingsbury, Parbury and Allen.
- Raugh, Harold E. (2004). The Victorians at War, 1815-1914: An Encyclopedia of British Military History. ABC-CLIO. ISBN 978-1-57607-925-6.
