= General Lindsay =

General Lindsay may refer to:

- Alexander Lindsay (East India Company officer) (1785–1872), British East India Company general
- Alexander Lindsay, 6th Earl of Balcarres (1752–1825), British Army general
- Sir David Lindsay, 4th Baronet (c. 1732–1797), British Army general
- George Lindsay (British Army officer) (1880–1956), British Army major general
- James Lindsay (British Army officer) (1815–1874), British Army lieutenant general
- James J. Lindsay (born 1932), U.S. Army four-star general
- John Lindsay, 20th Earl of Crawford (1702–1749), British Army lieutenant general
- Nathan J. Lindsay (1936–2015), U.S. Air Force major general
- Richard C. Lindsay (1905–1990), U.S. Air Force lieutenant general
- Walter Lindsay (1855–1930), British Army major general
- William Bethune Lindsay (1880–1933), Canadian Corps major general

== See also ==
- George Lindsay-Crawford, 22nd Earl of Crawford (1758–1808), British Army major general
- Julian Robert Lindsey (1871–1948), U.S. Army major general
- Patrick Lindesay (1778–1839), British Army major general
