= Ajay Pratap Singh =

Ajay Pratap Singh may refer to:

- Ajay Pratap Singh (Madhya Pradesh politician) (born 1967), Indian politician from Madhya Pradesh
- Ajay Pratap Singh (Uttar Pradesh politician) (1964-2025), Indian politician from Uttar Pradesh
- Ajay Pratap Singh (librarian) (fl. 2020-present), Indian academician, librarian and library administrator

== See also ==
- Ajeya Pratap Singh (born 1956), Indian politician
