= Richard Lindsay =

Richard Lindsay may refer to:

- Richard Lindsay (West Virginia politician), member of the West Virginia Senate
- Richard P. Lindsay, Utah politician and general authority of the Church of Jesus Christ of Latter-day Saints
- Richard C. Lindsay, United States Air Force general
- Richard Lindsay (civil servant), UK Special Envoy to Afghanistan

== See also ==
- Richard Lindsey, member of the Alabama House of Representatives
