= Governor-General of India =

Representative of the monarch

Viceroy and Governor-General of India
- Standard during the British Raj

- Standard during the Dominion of India
- Style: His Excellency
- Residence: Government House (1858–1931); Viceroy's House (1931–1950); Viceregal Lodge (1888–1947)
- Appointer: East India Company (1774–1858); Monarch of the United Kingdom (1858–1950)
- Term length: At His Majesty's pleasure (de jure) Five years, renewable (de facto)
- Formation: 20 October 1773 (Fort William); 22 April 1834 (India)
- First holder: Warren Hastings (Fort William); Lord William Bentinck (India)
- Final holder: Lord Mountbatten (21 February 1947 — 15 August 1947; as the Viceroy of India); Chakravarti Rajagopalachari (21 June 1948 — 26 January 1950; as the Governor-General of Dominion of India)
- Abolished: 26 January 1950 (76 years ago)
- Superseded by: Governor-General of Pakistan (in territory that became Pakistan); President of India (after India became a Republic by adopting its Constitution)

The governor-general of India (1833 to 1950, from 1858 to 1947 the Viceroy and Governor-General of India, commonly shortened to Viceroy of India) was the representative of the monarch of the United Kingdom in their capacity as the emperor or empress of India and after Indian independence in 1947, the representative of the monarch of India. The office was created in 1773, with the title of governor-general of the Presidency of Fort William. The officer had direct control only over his presidency but supervised other East India Company officials in India. Complete authority over all of British territory in the Indian subcontinent was granted in 1833, and the official came to be known as the governor-general of India.

In 1858, because of the Indian Rebellion the previous year, the territories and assets of the East India Company came under the direct control of the British Crown; as a consequence, Company rule in India was succeeded by the British Raj. The governor-general headed the central government of India, which administered the provinces of British India, including Bengal, Bombay, Madras, Punjab, the United Provinces, and others. However, much of India was not ruled directly by the British Raj; outside the provinces of British India, there were hundreds of nominally independent princely states or "native states", whose relationship was not with the British Indian government or the United Kingdom, but rather one of homage directly with the British monarch as sovereign successor to the Mughal emperors. From 1858, to reflect the governor-general's new additional role as the monarch's representative in response to the fealty relationships vis the princely states, the additional title of Viceroy was granted, such that the new office was entitled "Viceroy and Governor-General of India". This was usually shortened to "Viceroy of India" and was the head of government across much of Indian subcontinent.

The title of viceroy was abandoned when British India was partitioned into the two independent dominions of India and Pakistan, but the office of governor-general continued to exist in each country separately until they adopted republican constitutions in 1950 and 1956, respectively.

Until 1858, the governor-general was selected by the Court of Directors of the East India Company, to whom he was responsible. Thereafter, he was appointed by the sovereign on the advice of the British Government; the Secretary of State for India, a member of the British Cabinet, was responsible for instructing him on the exercise of their powers. After 1947, the sovereign continued to appoint the governor-general but thereafter did so on the advice of the government of the newly independent Dominion of India.

The governor-general served at the pleasure of the sovereign, though the practice was to have them serve five-year terms. A governor-general could have their commission rescinded; and if one was removed, or left, a provisional governor-general was sometimes appointed until a new holder of the office could be chosen. The first governor-general in India (of Bengal) was Warren Hastings, the first official governor-general of British India was Lord William Bentinck, and the first governor-general of the Dominion of India was Lord Mountbatten.

== History ==
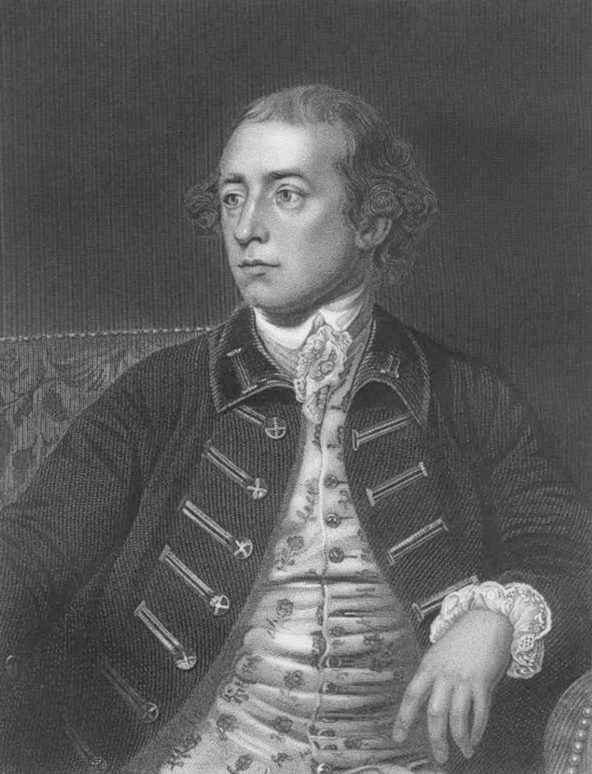
Warren Hastings, the first governor-general of Fort William from 1773 to 1785.

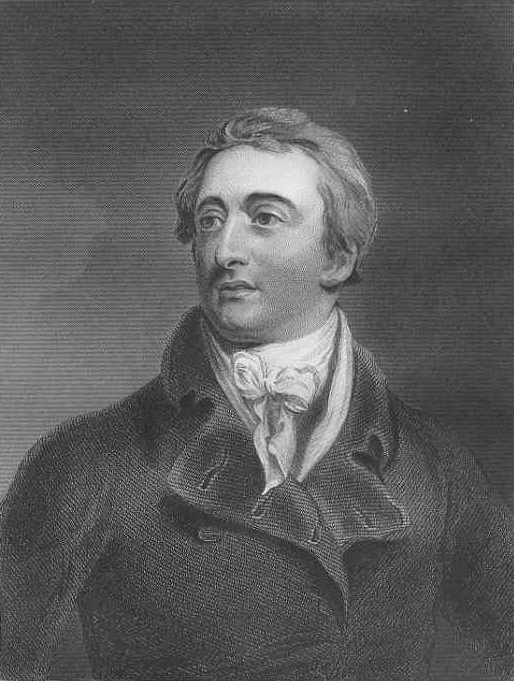
Lord William Bentinck, the first governor general of India from 1834 – 1835

Many parts of the Indian subcontinent were governed by the British East India Company (founded in 1600), which nominally acted as the agent of the Mughal emperor. Early British administrators were presidents or governors of the Bengal Presidency. In 1773, motivated by corruption in the Company, the British government assumed partial control over the governance of India with the passage of the Regulating Act 1773. A governor-general and Supreme Council of Bengal were appointed to rule over the Presidency of Fort William in Bengal. The first governor-general and Council were named in the Act.

The Charter Act 1833 replaced the governor-general and Council of Fort William with the governor-general and Council of India. The power to elect the governor-general was retained by the Court of Directors, but the choice became subject to the sovereign's approval via the India Board.

After the Indian Rebellion of 1857, the British East India Company's territories in India were put under the direct control of the sovereign. The Government of India Act 1858 vested the power to appoint the governor-general in the sovereign. The governor-general, in turn, had the power to appoint all lieutenant governors in India, subject to the sovereign's approval.

India and Pakistan acquired independence in 1947, but governors-general continued to be appointed over each nation until republican constitutions were written. Louis Mountbatten, 1st Earl Mountbatten of Burma, remained governor-general of India for ten months after independence, but the two nations were otherwise headed by native governors-general. India became a secular republic in 1950; Pakistan became an Islamic one in 1956.

== Functions ==
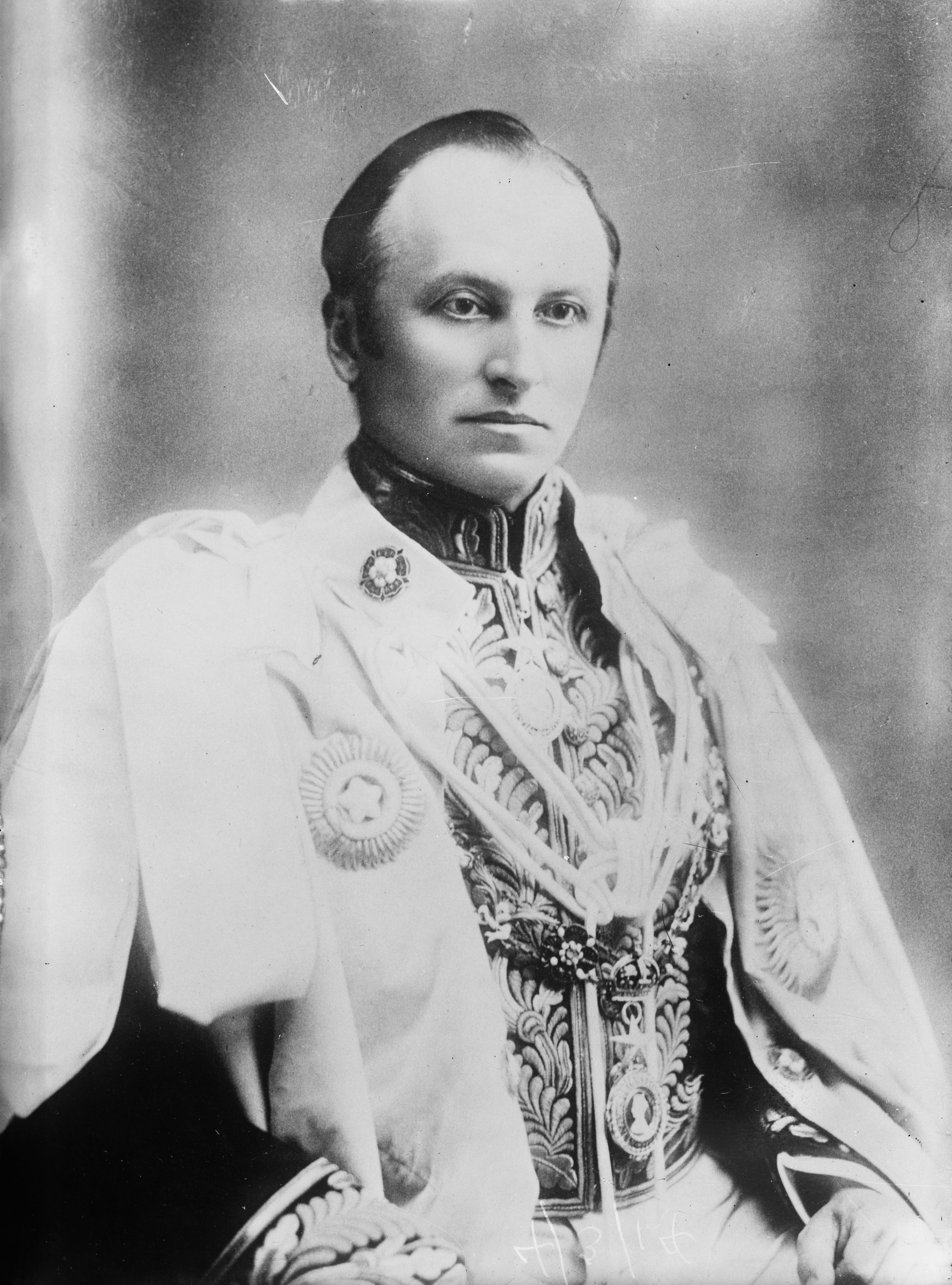
Lord Curzon in his robes as viceroy of India, a post he held from 1899 to 1905.

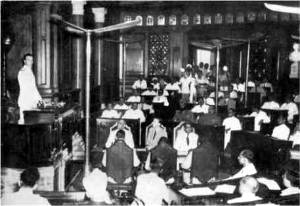
Lord Mountbatten addressing the Chamber of Princes as Crown Representative in the 1940s

The governor-general originally had power only over the Presidency of Fort William in Bengal. The Regulating Act, however, granted the governor-general additional powers relating to foreign affairs and defence. The other presidencies of the East India Company (Madras, Bombay and Bencoolen) were not allowed to declare war on or make peace with an Indian prince without receiving the prior approval of the governor-general and Council of Fort William.

The powers of the governor-general, in respect of foreign affairs, were increased by the India Act 1784. The act provided that the other governors under the East India Company could not declare war, make peace or conclude a treaty with an Indian prince unless expressly directed to do so by the governor-general or by the Company's Court of Directors.

While the governor-general thus became the controller of foreign policy in India, he was not the explicit head of British India. That status came only with the Charter Act 1833, which granted him "superintendence, direction and control of the whole civil and military Government" of all of British India. The act also granted legislative powers to the governor-general and council.

In 1835, Lord William Bentinck became the first governor general of India.

After 1858, the governor-general (now usually known as the viceroy) functioned as the chief administrator of India and as the sovereign's representative. India was divided into numerous provinces, each under the head of a governor, lieutenant governor or chief commissioner or administrator. Governors were appointed by the British government, to whom they were directly responsible; lieutenant governors, chief commissioners, and administrators, however, were appointed by and were subordinate to the viceroy. The viceroy also oversaw the most powerful princely rulers: the Nizam of Hyderabad, the Maharaja of Mysore, the Maharaja (Scindia) of Gwalior, the Maharaja of Jammu and Kashmir and the Gaekwad (Gaekwar) Maharaja of Baroda. The remaining princely rulers were overseen either by the Rajputana Agency and Central India Agency, which were headed by representatives of the viceroy or by provincial authorities.

The Chamber of Princes was an institution established in 1920 by a royal proclamation of King-Emperor George V to provide a forum in which the princely rulers could voice their needs and aspirations to the government. The chamber usually met only once a year, with the viceroy presiding, but it appointed a standing committee, which met more often.

Upon independence in August 1947, the title of viceroy was abolished. The representative of India's sovereign, King George VI, became known once again as the governor-general. In 1948, C. Rajagopalachari became the only Indian governor-general. The governor-general's role was almost entirely ceremonial, with power being exercised on a day-to-day basis by the Indian cabinet. After the nation became a republic in 1950, the president of India continued to perform the same functions.

== Council ==
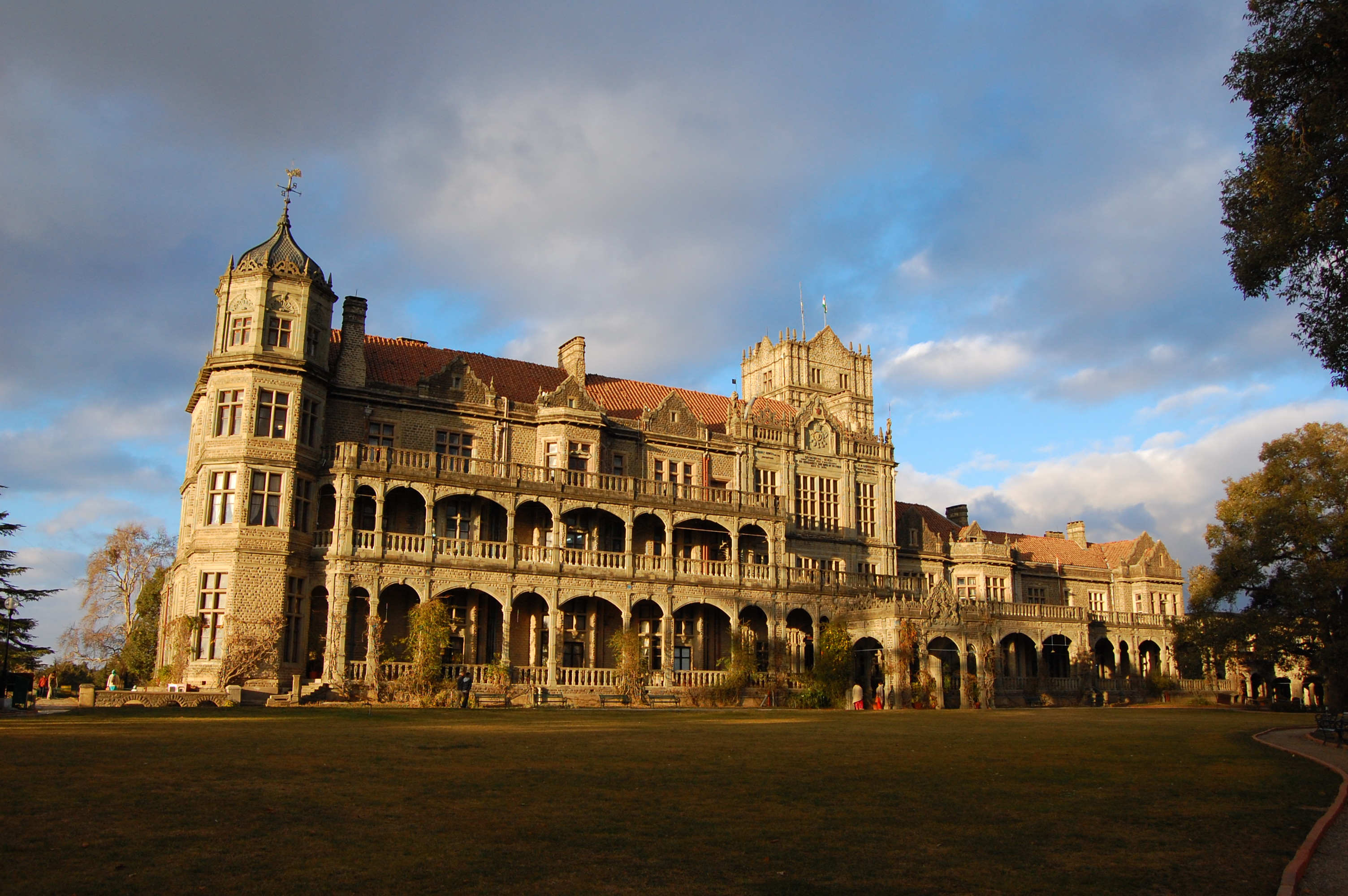
The Viceregal Lodge in Simla, built in 1888, was the summer residence of the viceroy of India

The governor-general was always advised by a Council on the exercise of his legislative and executive powers. The governor-general, while exercising many functions, was referred to as the "Governor-General in Council."

The Regulating Act 1773 provided for the election of four counsellors by the East India Company's Court of Directors. The governor-general was to be assisted by an executive council of four members and was given a casting vote but no veto. The decision of the council was binding on the governor-general.

In 1784, the council was reduced to three members; the governor-general continued to have both an ordinary vote and a casting vote. In 1786, the power of the governor-general was increased even further, as Council decisions ceased to be binding.

The Charter Act 1833 made further changes to the structure of the council. The Act was the first law to distinguish between the executive and legislative responsibilities of the governor-general. As provided under the Act, there were to be four members of the Council appointed by the Court of Directors. The first three members were permitted to participate on all occasions, but the fourth member was only allowed to sit and vote when legislation was being debated.

In 1858, the Court of Directors ceased to have the power to appoint members of the council. Instead, the one member who had a vote only on legislative questions came to be appointed by the sovereign, and the other three members by the secretary of state for India.

The Indian Councils Act 1861 made several changes to the council's composition. Three members were to be appointed by the Secretary of State for India, and two by the Sovereign. The power to appoint all five members passed to the Crown in 1869. The viceroy was empowered to appoint an additional 'six to twelve' members (changed to 'ten to sixteen' in 1892, and to 'sixty' in 1909). The five individuals appointed by the sovereign or the Indian secretary headed the executive departments, while those appointed by the viceroy debated and voted on legislation.

In 1919, an Indian legislature, consisting of a Council of State and a Legislative Assembly, took over the legislative functions of the Viceroy's Council. The viceroy nonetheless retained significant power over legislation. He could authorise the expenditure of money without the Legislature's consent for "ecclesiastical, political [and] defence" purposes, and for any purpose during "emergencies." He was permitted to veto, or even stop debate on, any bill. If he recommended the passage of a bill, but only one chamber cooperated, he could declare the bill passed over the objections of the other chamber. The legislature had no authority over foreign affairs and defence. The president of the Council of State was appointed by the viceroy; the Legislative Assembly elected its president, but the election required the viceroy's approval.

== Style and title ==
Until 1833, the title of the position was "governor-general of the Presidency of Fort William in Bengal". The Government of India Act 1833 converted the title into "governor-general of India", effective from 22 April 1834. The title "viceroy and governor-general" was first used in the queen's proclamation appointing Viscount Canning in 1858. It was never conferred by an act of parliament but was used in warrants of precedence and in the statutes of knightly orders. In usage, "viceroy" is employed where the governor-general's position as the monarch's representative is in view. The viceregal title was not used when the sovereign was present in India. It was meant to indicate new responsibilities, especially ritualistic ones, but it conferred no new statutory authority. The governor-general regularly used the title in communications with the Imperial Legislative Council, but all legislation was made only in the name of the Governor-General-in-Council (or the Government of India).

The governor-general was styled Excellency and enjoyed precedence over all other government officials in India. He was referred to as 'His Excellency' and addressed as 'Your Excellency'. From 1858 to 1947, the governor-general was known as the viceroy of India (from the French roi, meaning 'king'), and wives of Viceroys were known as Vicereines (from the French reine, meaning 'queen'). The Vicereine was referred to as 'Her Excellency' and was also addressed as 'Your Excellency'. Neither title was employed while the Sovereign was in India. However, the only British sovereign to visit India during the period of British rule was George V, who attended the Delhi Durbar in 1911 with his wife, Mary.

When the Order of the Star of India was founded in 1861, the viceroy was made its grand master ex officio. The viceroy was also made the ex officio grand master of the Order of the Indian Empire upon its foundation in 1877.

Most governors-general and viceroys were peers. Frequently, a viceroy who was already a peer would be granted a peerage of higher rank, as with the granting of a marquessate to Lord Reading and an earldom and later a marquessate to Freeman Freeman-Thomas. Of those viceroys who were not peers, Sir John Shore was a baronet, and Lord William Bentinck was entitled to the courtesy title 'lord' because he was the son of a duke. Only the first and last governors-general – Warren Hastings and Chakravarti Rajagopalachari – as well as some provisional governors-general, had no honorific titles at all.

== Flag and insignia ==
From around 1885, the viceroy of India was allowed to fly a Union Jack Flag augmented in the centre with the 'Star of India' surmounted by a crown. This flag was not the viceroy's personal flag; it was also used by governors, lieutenant governors, chief commissioners and other British officers in India. When at sea, only the viceroy flew the flag from the mainmast, while other officials flew it from the foremast.

From 1947 to 1950, the governor-general of India used a dark blue flag bearing the royal crest (a lion standing on the Crown), beneath which was the word 'India' in gold majuscules. The same design is still used by many other Commonwealth Realm governors-general. This last flag was the personal flag of the governor-general only.

Badge of the viceroy of India (1876–1904) depicted with St. Edward's Crown

Badge of the viceroy and governor-general (1904–1947) depicted with Tudor Crown

Standard of the viceroy and governor-general (1885–1947)

Standard of the governor-general (1947–50)

== Residence ==
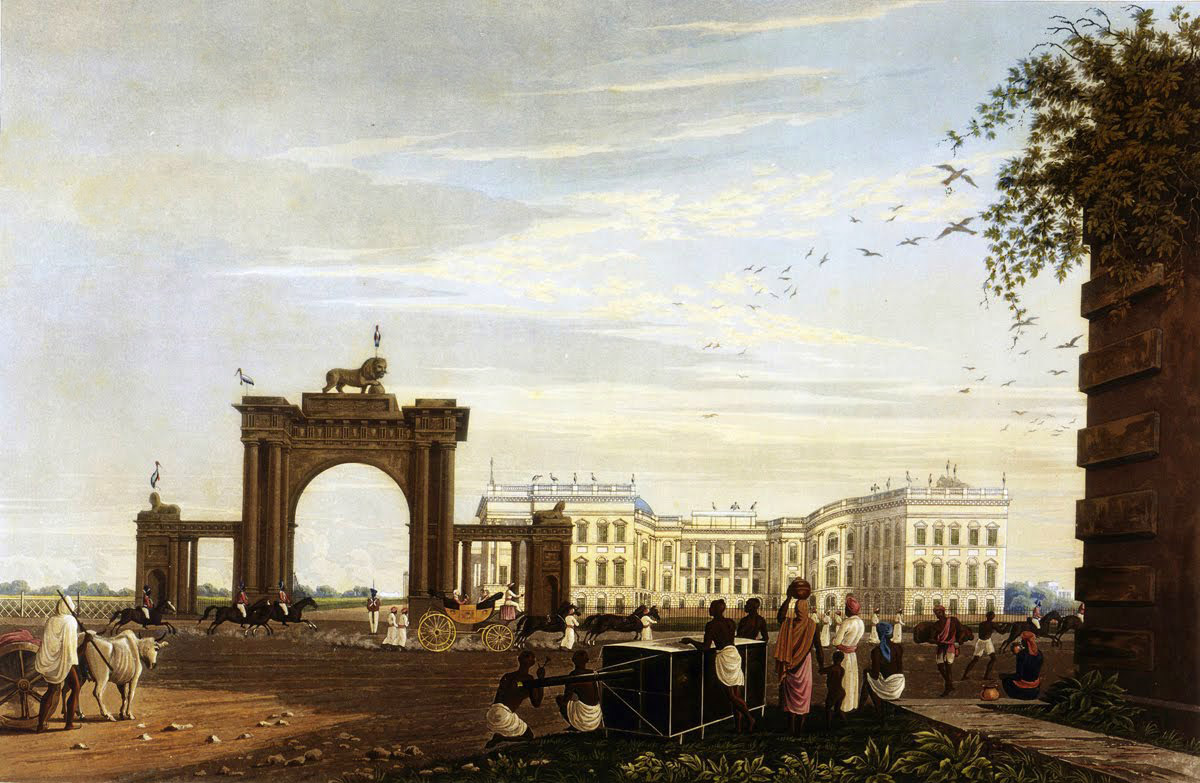
Government House served as the Governor-General's residence during most of the nineteenth century.

The governor-general of Fort William resided in Belvedere House, Calcutta, until the early nineteenth century, when Government House was constructed. In 1854, the lieutenant governor of Bengal took up residence there. Now, the Belvedere Estate houses the National Library of India.

Lord Wellesley, who is reputed to have said that 'India should be governed from a palace, not from a country house', constructed a grand mansion, known as Government House in Calcutta, between 1799 and 1803. The mansion remained in use until the capital moved from Calcutta to Delhi in 1912. Thereafter, the lieutenant governor of Bengal, who had hitherto resided in Belvedere House, was upgraded to a full governor and transferred to Government House. Now, it serves as the residence of the governor of the Indian state of West Bengal, and is referred to by its Bengali name Raj Bhavan.

After the capital moved from Calcutta to Delhi, the viceroy occupied the newly built Viceroy's House, designed by Sir Edwin Lutyens. Though construction began in 1912, it did not conclude until 1929; the palace was not formally inaugurated until 1931. The final cost exceeded £877,000 (over £35 million in modern terms)—more than twice the figure originally allocated. Today the residence, now known by the Hindi name of 'Rashtrapati Bhavan', is used by the president of India.

Throughout the British administration, governors-general retreated to the Viceregal Lodge (now Rashtrapati Niwas) at Shimla each summer to escape the heat, and the government of India moved with them. The Viceregal Lodge now houses the Indian Institute of Advanced Study. The Peterhoff building in Shimla was also used by several viceroys, although the original building was destroyed by fire in 1981.

== See also ==
- British Empire
- Commander-in-Chief, India
- Council of India
- Emperor of India
- History of Bangladesh
- History of India
- History of Pakistan
- India Office
- Indian Civil Service
- Indian independence movement
- List of governors-general of India
- Partition of India
