= 104th Brigade =

104th Brigade may refer to:

== Croatia ==
- 104th Brigade (Croatia)

== Germany ==
- 104th Panzer Brigade

== Philippines ==
- 104th Infantry Brigade (Philippines)

== Spain ==
- 104th Mixed Brigade (Republican Spain)

== Ukraine ==
- 104th Territorial Defense Brigade, a unit of the Ukrainian Territorial Defense Forces

== United Kingdom ==
=== Artillery units ===
- 104th Brigade, Royal Field Artillery (World War I)
- 104th (Essex Yeomanry) Brigade, Royal Field Artillery (after World War I)

=== Other UK units ===
- 104th Brigade (United Kingdom)
- 104 Theatre Sustainment Brigade

== See also ==
- 104th Division (disambiguation)
- 104th Regiment (disambiguation)
