= National Library of India =

Largest library of India in Kolkata

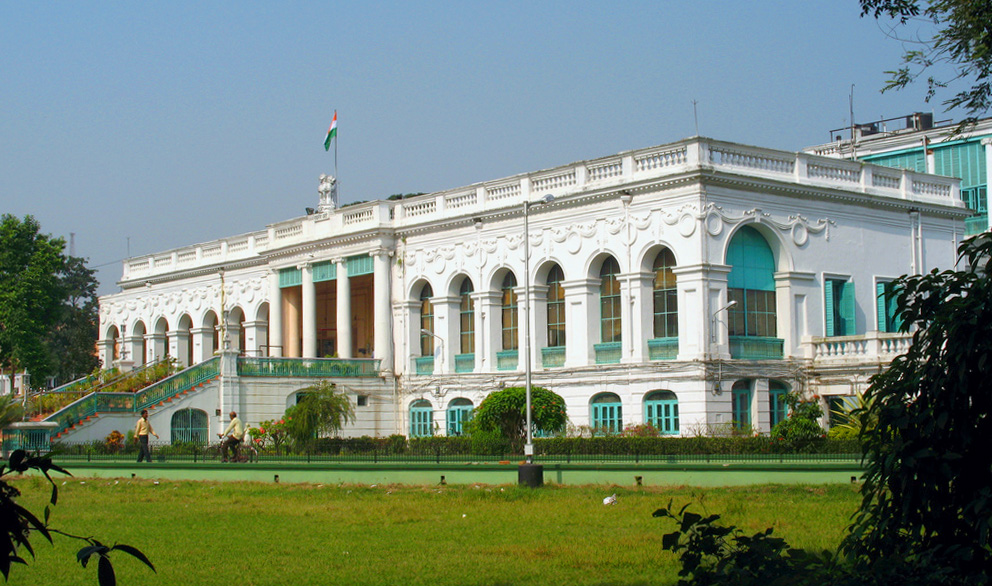
- Façade of the National Library of India
- 22°32′00″N 88°20′00″E
- Location: Belvedere Estate, Kolkata, West Bengal, India
- Type: National library
- Established: 1836; 190 years ago (as Calcutta Public Library); 30 January 1903; 123 years ago (as Imperial Library); 1 February 1953 (73 years ago) (as National Library of India)

Collection
- Items collected: books, journals, newspapers, magazines, sound and music recordings, patents, databases, maps, stamps, prints, drawings and manuscripts
- Size: 2.5M

Other information
- Budget: ₹74 crore (US$7.7 million)
- Director: Ajay Pratap Singh
- Parent organization: Government of India
- Affiliation: Ministry of Culture
- Website: nationallibrary.gov.in

The National Library of India is a library located in the Belvedere Estate, Alipore, Kolkata, India. The National Library was moved there in 1953 into the estate where the former British Viceroys resided. It is India's largest library by volume and public record. The National Library is under Ministry of Culture, Government of India. The library is designated to collect, disseminate and preserve printed material produced within India. With a collection in excess of 2.5 million books and records, it is the largest in the country.

The National Library is the successor to the Imperial Library, which in 1903 was combined with another library, the Calcutta Public Library and eventually became known as the National Library of India after independence.

== Calcutta Public Library ==
In the 18th and earlier 19th century, Calcutta saw the formation of multiple libraries, however the libraries tended to be exclusive and limited entry to only a select few of the British elites and lacking in terms of library facilities. Later by the first few decades of the 19th century, there was a surge in the formation of libraries in India, especially in the larger cities such as Calcutta given the demand by the wider public, both Western educated locals and Europeans that required reading and knowledge spaces. Furthermore, the exclusive nature of libraries prior to the establishment of the Calcutta Public Library, which was limited to the British elite or colonial officers was thought to have contributed to the failure of these libraries in staying open for a longer period of time.

The Calcutta Public Library was opened on 21 March 1836, and its collection rapidly grew, and less than a decade later by 1843, it was said have 130,000 volumes. The establishment of the library marked a new start of modern libraries in India which was intended to support Western education for the of locals as well as add to the collection of knowledge. The library housed collections from older institutions such as the Fort William College, whereby Sir Charles Metcalfe, the Governor General of India of the time, had ordered 4,675 volumes to be moved from the library of the defunct Fort William College to the newly established Calcutta Public Library.

It was the first public library in India in that era to be established on a propriety basis through the joint efforts of the Western-educated locals, British colonial officers as well as other Englishmen who worked in various occupations. To share the attitude of many in wanting the establishment of a library, JH Stocqueler, editor of the Englishmen newspaper, released an address in August 1835 stating that the lack of a library for general reading and reference was a “considerable inconvenience sustained by almost all classes of the community in Calcutta”. At the end of that same month after a meeting among the prominent citizens of Calcutta, the plans to establish a public subscription library was confirmed and a press release was sent to the editors of newspapers that announced a list of the names of the library's benefactors which attracted more wealthier citizens to come forward and join. Amongst this group, prominent Indian leader, businessman and industrialist, Dwarkanath Tagore, became the first proprietor of Calcutta Public Library. The local press reported him to have paid 500 rupees. Proprietors were library members that governed the library and provided substantial amounts of money that would go into its operations. The library was decided to be open to all without distinguishing class or background and those who paid at least a total of 300 rupees whether in one payment or various installments were regarded as library proprietors. Aside from the proprietors and their higher fees, a different set of user subscription fees were split into three different classes; first class subscribers paid 20 rupees and 6 rupees for every month, second class subscribers paid 16 rupees and 4 rupees monthly, and third class subscribers paid 10 rupees and 2 rupees for every subsequent month.

The establishment of the library had a profound impact on the educated enlightened local population in the Bengal region and it further encouraged establishment of public libraries throughout the region in the second half of the 19th century. The British also viewed the development of public libraries as a means to spread their literary culture and ideals in the colonies. With more English novels and materials in circulation it was thought to encourage the local Indian populations to develop more similar “opinions, morals, taste and intellect”.

However, despite positive reception of the library in the early days of its opening, by the later part of the 19th century, the Calcutta Public Library was observed to be underutilised and forgotten, especially after the 1857 Indian Mutiny where the British gradually lost interest in being involved with the library. In the 1901, the library collection was acquired by the colonial government in India. The Imperial Act of 1902 promulgated by Lord Curzon, the viceroy of India, officially merged Calcutta Public Library with the Imperial Library, another library with also a rich and vast but underutilised collection.

== The Imperial Library ==
The Imperial Library was formed in 1891 by combining a number of Secretariat libraries in Calcutta. Of those, the most important and interesting was the library of the Home Department, which contained many books formerly belonging to the library of East India College, Fort William and the library of the former India Board in London. But, the use of the library was restricted to the superior officers of the Government.

After the merging of the Calcutta Public Library and the previous Imperial Library, the new Imperial Library was open to the general public, a first for a library run by the colonial government.

Sir Ashutosh Mukherjee was appointed as the president of imperial library council (1910) to which he donated his personal collection of 80,000 books arranged in a separate section.

== Declaring the Imperial Library as the National Library ==
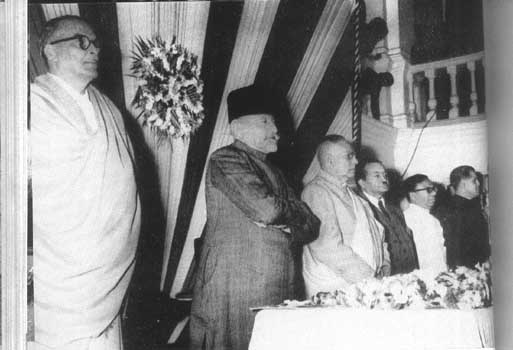
Formal opening of the National Library, c. 1 February 1953. Among those present are (from left to right) B. C. Roy, Maulana Azad, HC. Mukherjee, SS Bhatnagar, Humayun Kabir, and BS Kesavan.

After independence the Government of India changed the name of the Imperial Library to the National Library by Imperial Library (Change of Name) Act, 1948, and the collection was transferred from The Esplanade to the present Belvedere Estate. On 1 February 1953 the National Library was opened to the public by Maulana Abul Kalam Azad.

By 1953, the collection of the National Library was close a million and its size was well in comparison to national libraries of Western counterparts.

The name of National Library was changed to National Library of India by section 18 of the National Library of India Act, 1976.

The library collects book, periodicals, and titles in virtually all the Indian languages while the special collections in the National Library of India house at least fifteen languages. The Hindi department has books that date back all the way to the nineteenth century and the first ever books printed in that language. The collections break down and consist of 86,000 maps and 3,200 manuscripts.

== The Delivery of Books Act 1954 ==
The Delivery of Books and Newspapers (Public Libraries) Act, 1954, Act No. 27 of 1954 was passed by the government in May 1954 which made it mandatory for publishers in India to send a copy of their books to the National Library at Calcutta within a month after publication. Aside from the National Library, the Act mandated publishers to send a copy to each of the three other major libraries in the cities of Delhi, Bombay and Madras which are respectively located in the north, west and south of India.

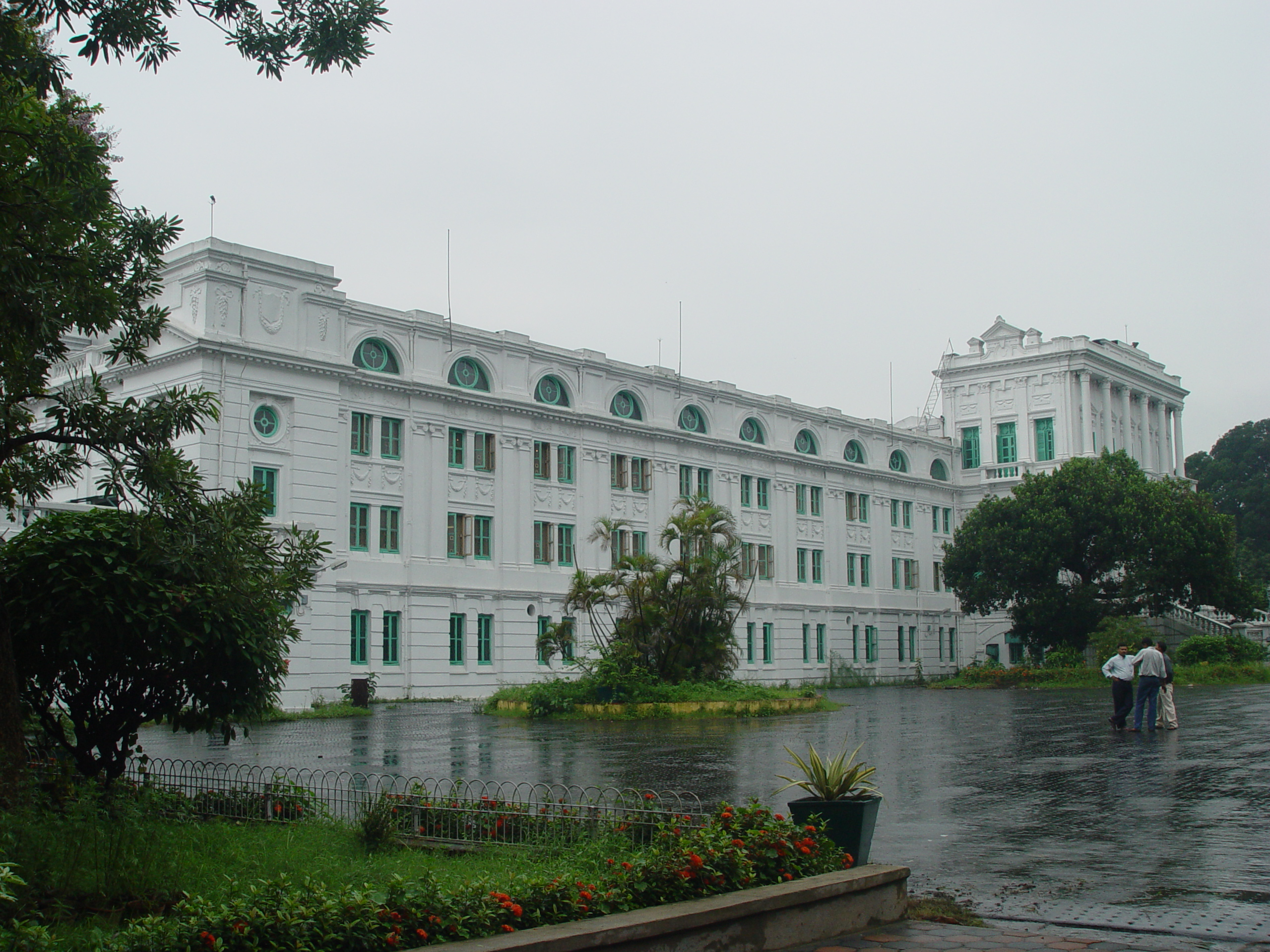
National Library

== Discovery of hidden chamber ==
In 2010, the Ministry of Culture, the owner of the library, decided to get the library building restored by the Archaeological Survey of India (ASI). While taking stock of the library building, the conservation engineers discovered a previously unknown room. The secret ground-floor room, about 1000 sq. ft. in size, seems to have no opening of any kind.

The ASI archaeologists tried to search the first floor area (that forms the ceiling of the room) for a trap door, but found nothing. Since the building is of historical and cultural importance, ASI has decided to bore a hole through the wall instead of breaking it. There are speculations about the room being a punishment room used by Warren Hastings and other British officials, or a place to store treasure.

In 2011, the researchers announced that the room was filled entirely with mud, probably in an effort to stabilise the building.

== Museum of Word (Shabdalok) ==
On July 19, 2026, the Ministry of Culture inaugurated an immersive 'Museum of Word' at the National Library. Featuring nine state-of-the-art galleries, it "encourage visitors to interact with language rather than simply read about it. Interactive boards, touch-based exhibits, games and puzzles introduce words from all 22 official languages of India, allowing visitors to learn through play," writes The Telegraph, an English newspaper headquartered in Kolkata.
