= 104th Division (2nd Formation) (People's Republic of China) =

104th Division (1951-52) 6th Building Construction Division (1952-53)
- Active: 1951.2 - 1955.4
- Country: People's Republic of China
- Branch: People's Liberation Army
- Type: Division
- Role: Infantry
- Garrison/HQ: Taizhou, Zhejiang

The 104th Division (Chinese: 第104师)(2nd Formation) was activated on February 26, 1951 from 6th Military Sub-district. The division was composed of:

- 310th Infantry Regiment (former 6th Security Regiment of Zhejiang Military District);
- 311th Infantry Regiment (local forces from 6th Military Sub-district);
- 312th Infantry Regiment (former 7th Security Regiment of Zhejiang Military District).

In May 1952 the division was reorganized as 6th Building Construction Division (Chinese: 建筑工程第6师), all its regiments were redesignated as follow:

- 16th Building Construction Regiment (former 310th Infantry);
- 17th Building Construction Regiment (former 311th Infantry);
- 18th Building Construction Regiment (former 312th Infantry).

In 1953 the division was reorganized as 3rd Building Construction Corporation of Eastern China(Chinese: 华东建筑工程第三公司).

In 1955 the corporation moved to Xi'an and renamed as 3rd Building Construction Corporation of Northeast(Chinese: 西北建筑工程第三公司). In the same year the corporation was merged into 3rd Sanitary Facility Installation Corporation(Chinese: 第三卫生设备安装公司).

In April 1955 the corporation was demobilized.
