= 104th Division (1st Formation) (People's Republic of China) =

104th Division (1948–51)
- Active: 1948.10 - 1951.2
- Country: People's Republic of China
- Branch: People's Liberation Army
- Type: Division
- Role: Infantry
- Part of: 35th Corps
- Engagements: Chinese Civil War

The 104th Division(Chinese: 第104师) was created in October 1948 basing on defected 161st Reorganized Brigade of 96th Reorganized Corps, Republic of China Army.

The division was a part of PLA 35th Corps.

In February 1949 the division absorbed 46th Division of Luzhongnan Column of the People's Liberation Army. 3 regiments from the original 161st Reorganized Brigade were merged as 310th Regiment, and 311th and 312th Regiments were reorganized from 136th and 138th Regiments from 46th Division.

In April 1949 the division took part in the Nanjing Campaign. On April 24, 2nd Battalion, 312th Regiment of the division seized the Presidential Palace in Nanjing.

From January 16, 1950 the division was acting as Shaoxing Military Sub-district.

On February 15, 1951 the division was disbanded.

As of its disbandment the division was composed of:

- 310th Regiment;
- 311th Regiment;
- 312th Regiment.
