= Belvedere Estate =

Calcutta location of the National Library of India

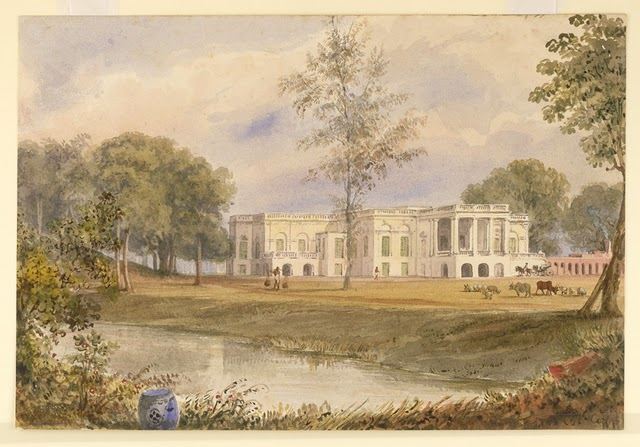
Illustration of Belvedere House, 1838, by the Anglo-Indian merchant and artist William Prinsep. The estate belonged to the family, who sold it to the East India Company in 1854.

The Belvedere Estate consists of Belvedere House and the 30-acre (12 ha) grounds surrounding it. It is located in Alipore, near the zoo, in Kolkata. It served as the main residence of 1st Governor-General of Bengal Presidency, Warren Hastings. In 1803, after the residence was shifted to Government House, it was used for various purposes before the Lieutenant-Governor of Bengal took up residence in Belvedere House from 1854 onwards. When the capital moved from Kolkata to Delhi in 1911, the Lieutenant-Governor of Bengal, who had hitherto resided in Belvedere House, was upgraded to a full governor and transferred to Government House. Belvedere House has been the home of the National Library of India since 1948.

== History ==
In 1760, Mir Jafar Ali Khan, the Nawab of the province of Bengal, was compelled by the East India Company to abdicate his throne at Murshidabad to Qasim Khan. Mir Jafar moved to Kolkata where he owned a large court house, and settled within the safety of East India Company fortifications at Alipore. While he was in Kolkata, he built many buildings in the area and gifted Belvedere House to Warren Hastings.

It is not known when Hastings got the ownership of this house, but in 1763, he had made a request to the Supreme Council asking for "permission of the Board to build a bridge over Collighut (Kalighat) Nulla on the road to his garden house." In 1769, according to Dutch author Stavorinus, the house was occupied by Harry Verelst and subsequently by John Cartier in 1770, both were Governors.

After the Battle of Buxar in 1764 Hastings left for England, but returned to Kolkata as governor in 1772 and to Belvedere House with Baroness Inhoff by his side.

Hastings sold Belvedere House to Major William Tolly for Rs. 60,000 in February 1780. The grounds of Belvedere Estate were witness to a duel between Warren Hastings and his legal officer, Philip Francis, in August 1780. Tolly died in 1784 and his family sold the property to Nicholas Nugent in 1802. Then, in 1810, it was bought by John Brereton Birch and, between 1822 and 1825, it was owned by Edward Paget. It was owned by Shambhu Chandra Mukhopadhyay in 1827.

The building was subsequently acquired by James Mackillop, who sold it to the Prinsep family in June 1841. The Prinsep company sold it on to the East India Company, for use as the official residence of the Governors-General of the Presidency of Fort William, in 1854.

However, following the transfer of power from the East India Company to the British Government, the distinction of official residence of the Governors-General of the Presidency of Fort William was transferred to Government House, in 1858.

Frederick Halliday was appointed as the first Lieutenant-Governor of Bengal and, in 1858, he took up residence at Belvedere House. When the capital moved from Kolkata to Delhi in 1911, the Lieutenant-Governor of Bengal, who had hitherto resided in Belvedere House, was upgraded to a full governor and transferred to Government House.

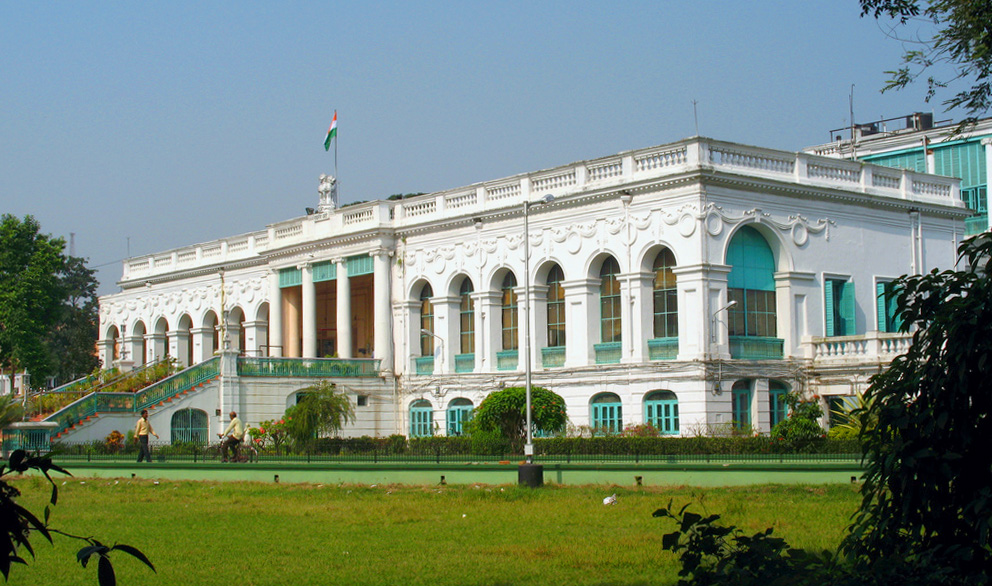
National Library of India, Kolkata, has been housed in Belvedere House since 1948.

After independence, in 1948, the National Library of India was transferred from The Esplanade to Belvedere House.

The complex now includes within it, two housing colonies built by the government, one being for National Library of India employees, and the other for central government employees. The main building is under the care of the Archaeological Survey of India.

== See also ==
- Government Houses of the British Empire
