= Ajay Pratap Singh (librarian) =

Indian academic and librarian

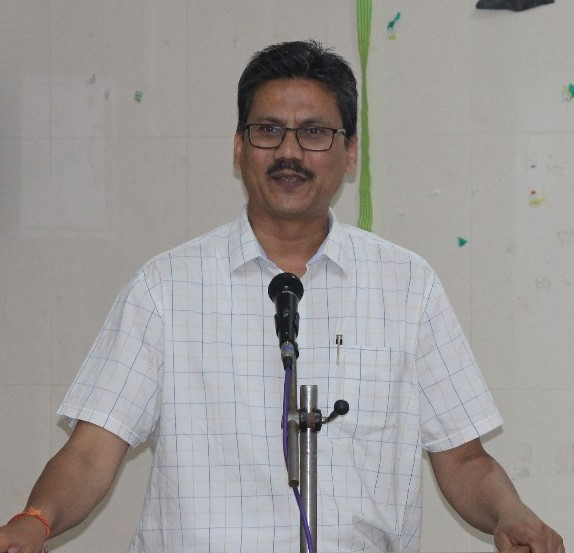
- Singh in 2019

Director General National Library of India
- In office 18 September 2023 – present

Raja Rammohun Roy Library Foundation
- In office June 2020 – September 2023

Personal details
- Education: M.Lib. and PhD in Library Science
- Alma mater: Delhi University, Sagar University
- Occupation: Academic, Professor

Ajay Pratap Singh is an Indian academician, librarian and library administrator. He is currently serving as the Director General, National Library of India, Kolkata since March 2021. Earlier he administered Raja Rammohun Roy Library Foundation (RRRLF), the only government funding agency and autonomous organization for public libraries in India under the Ministry of Culture, Government of India from June 2020 to Sept 2023. He is also Professor of Library and Information Science at Banaras Hindu University, Varanasi.

Singh, as Director General of the National Library of India, initiated Memoranda of Understanding with universities across the country to strengthen research collaboration, skill development, and innovation. He emphasized greater academic access to the National Library's rare and special collections to support scholars and students.

During his tenure, the Delivery of Books and Newspapers (Public Libraries) Act, 1954 was amended through the Jan Vishwas (Amendment of Provisions) Act, 2026, introducing a revised compliance framework that replaced immediate fines with a warning mechanism, protecting small publishers from disproportionate penalties for procedural delays.
