= 104th Street =

104th Street may refer to the following stations of the New York City Subway in Manhattan and Queens:

- 104th Street (BMT Jamaica Line), serving the J and Z trains
- 104th Street (IND Fulton Street Line), serving the A train
- 104th Street (IRT Ninth Avenue Line), demolished
