= Lok Bhavan, Kolkata =

Residence of the governor of West Bengal

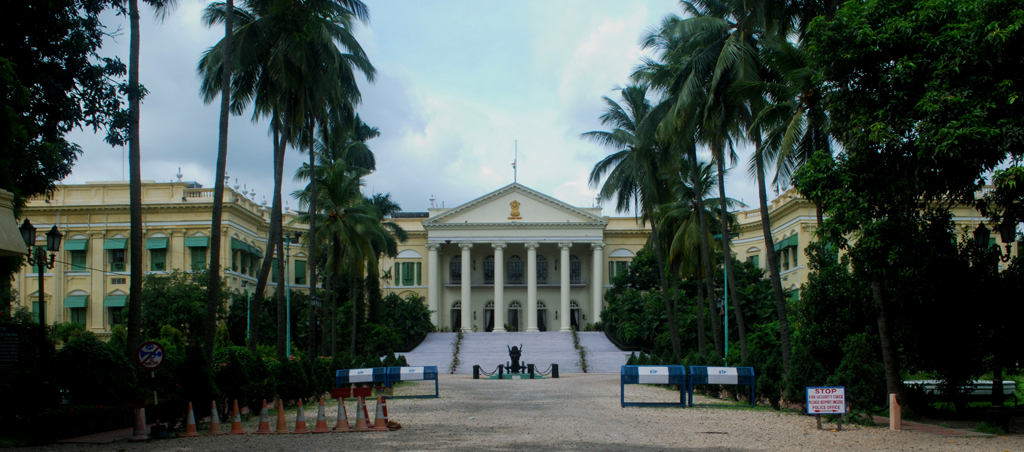
- Front façade of Raj Bhavan
- Former names: Government House (1803–1950); Raj Bhavan (1950–2025)

General information
- Coordinates: 22.567261°N 88.347520°E
- Construction started: 1799
- Completed: 1803
- Cost: Rupees 13 lakh (1,300,000) (£63,300)
- Owner: Government of West Bengal

Technical details
- Floor area: 7,800 square metres (84,000 square feet)

Design and construction
- Architect: Charles Wyatt

Other information
- Number of rooms: 90

Website
- rajbhavankolkata.gov.in

Lok Bhavan, formally known as Raj Bhavan (1950–2025) and Government House (1803–1950) is the official residence of the Governor of West Bengal, located in Kolkata, the capital of West Bengal.

Built in 1803 during the Company rule in India, it became the official residence of the Viceroy of India in 1858 after the transfer of power from the Company to the British Crown. With the shifting of the Indian capital from then-Calcutta to New Delhi in 1911, it became the official residence of the Governor of Bengal (now West Bengal) and has served the same purpose since.

== History ==
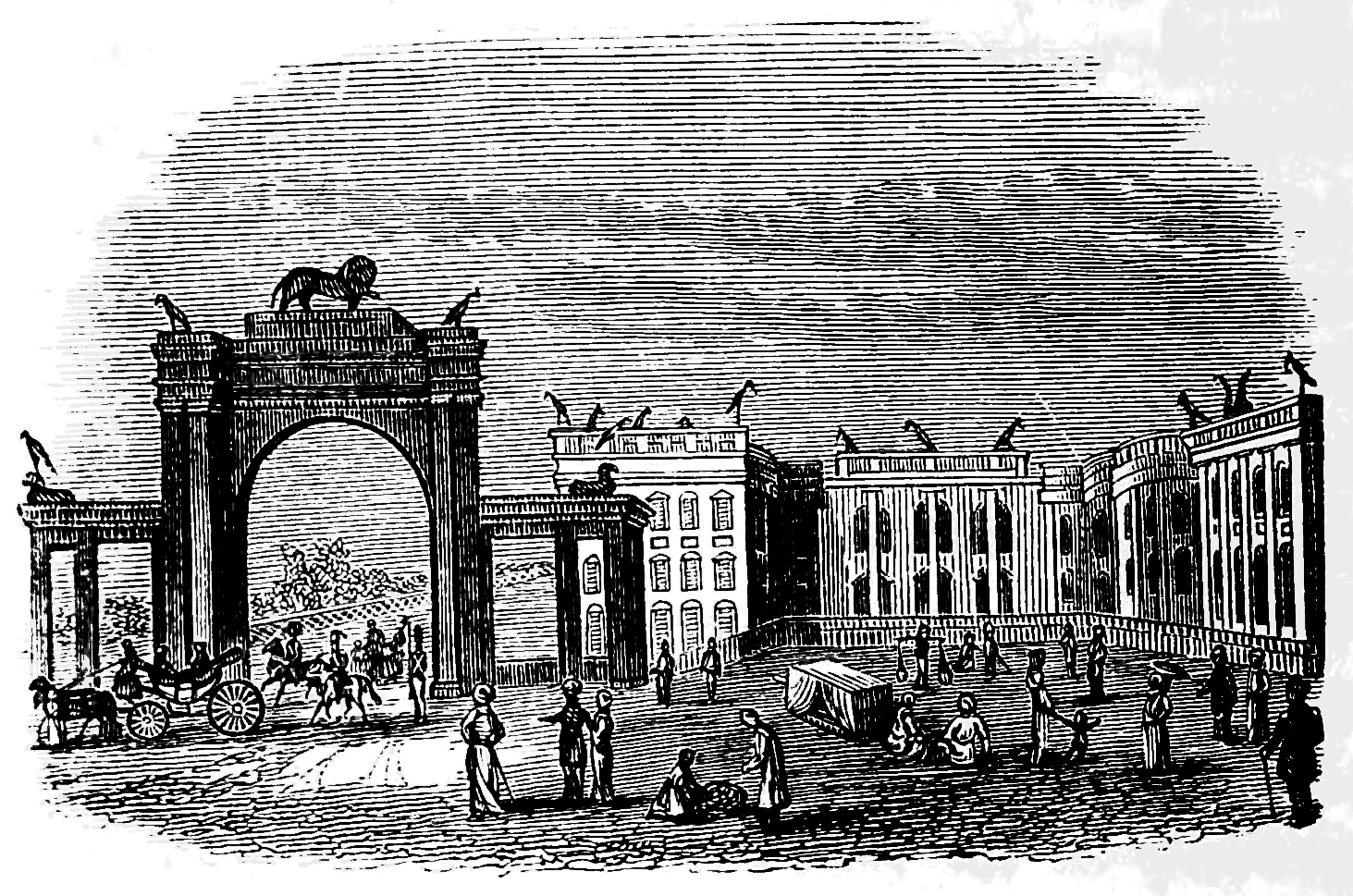
Illustration of Government house in 1855

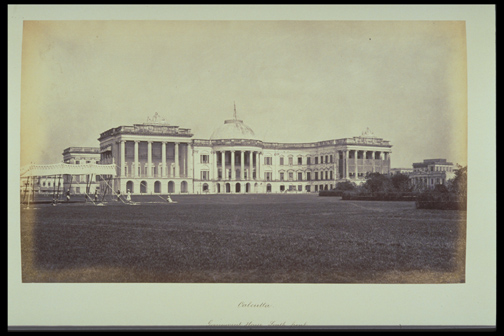
Government House, South Front, photographed by Samuel Bourne

In the early nineteenth century, Calcutta was at the height of its golden age. Known as the City of Palaces or St. Petersburg of the East, Calcutta was the richest, largest and most elegant colonial city of India.

Before 1799, the Governor-General of Fort William (Bengal) resided in a rented house, called "Buckingham House", located in the same location. The land belonged to Mohammad Reza Khan, a Nawab of Chitpur. In 1799, the 1st Marquess Wellesley, the then Governor-General, reportedly said that "India should be governed from a palace, not from a country house", and began the construction of a grand mansion.

After four years' construction, it was completed at a colossal cost of £63,291 (about £3.8 million in today's estimate). Lord Wellesley was accused of misusing the East India Company's funds and was eventually recalled back to England in 1805.

After the transfer of power from the East India Company to the British Crown in 1858, it became the official residence of the Viceroy of India, moving here from the Belvedere Estate. In 1892, the Otis Elevator Company installed the first elevator in India in the Raj Bhavan.

The construction of New Delhi as the British Raj's new planned capital began in 1911, with the chief official residence of the Viceroy and Governor-General being eventually moved there too, the new official residence being named Viceroy's House. The Lieutenant-Governor of Bengal, who had hitherto resided in Belvedere House, was upgraded to a full governor and his residence transferred to Government House in Calcutta.

== Architecture ==
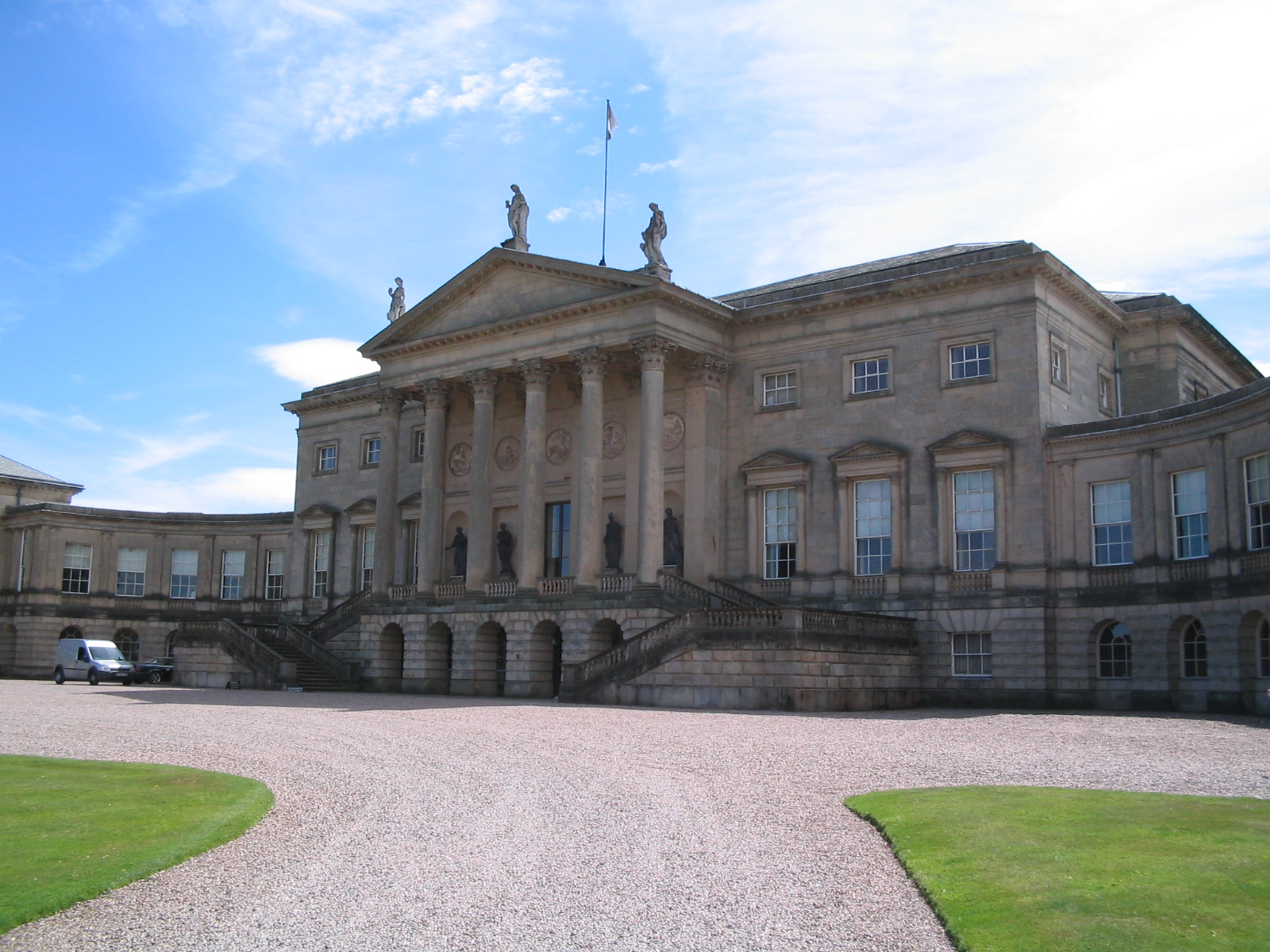
Kedleston Hall

Government House was designed by Capt. Charles Wyatt on the lines of Kedleston Hall, the Curzon family estate in Derbyshire. The building follows a neoclassical style with distinct Baroque overtones. Coincidentally, the most illustrious son of the Curzon family, Lord Curzon, would come to occupy the building as the Viceroy and Governor-General of India exactly 100 years after its construction started (1899-1905). Curzon described Government House as “without doubt the finest Government House occupied by the representative of any Sovereign or Government in the world.”

In the 1860s, Viceroy James Bruce, 8th Earl of Elgin, added the metallic dome to the building. Lord Curzon brought electricity and an elevator (popularly known as the "birdcage lift") to Raj Bhavan.

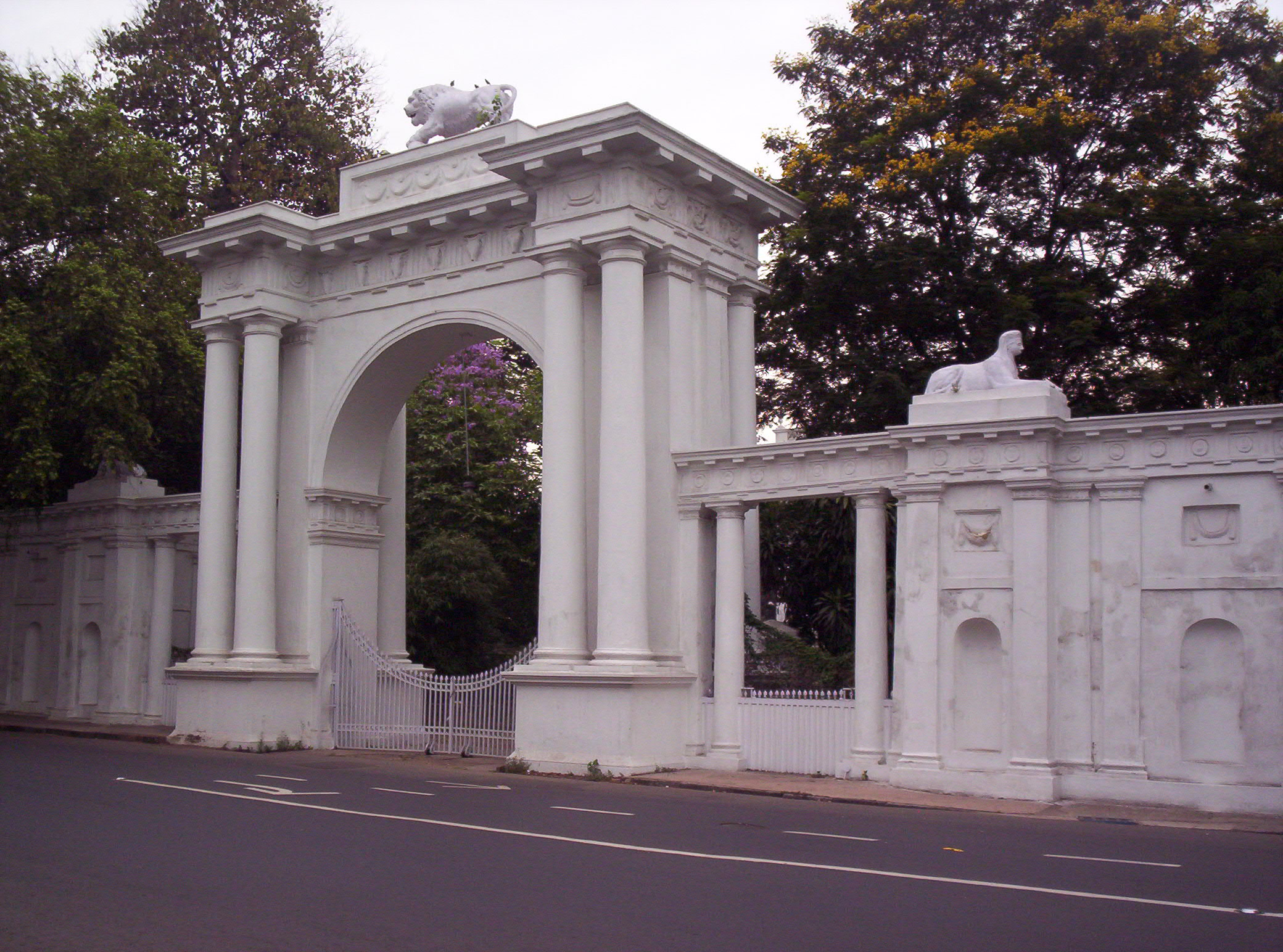
Arched Gate of the Raj Bhavan

The architectural plan comprises a central core with four radiating wings. The state rooms located in the central core are accessed from the outside by a flight of grand steps on the north. On the south is another portico surmounted by a colonnaded verandah with a dome above. The four wings accommodate the various offices and residential quarters along with four sets of staircases. The plan of the wings allows for a great deal of natural ventilation in the spaces while also permitting views across the gardens. The wings are decorated with large coats of arms.

The Raj Bhavan covers an area of 7,800 square metres (84,000 square feet) and is surrounded by a compound of 11 hectares (27 acres). The Raj Bhavan has six gateways, one each on the north and south and two each on the east and west. The four gates on the east and west have grand archways topped with lions, while the minor archways on the side are topped with sphinxes.

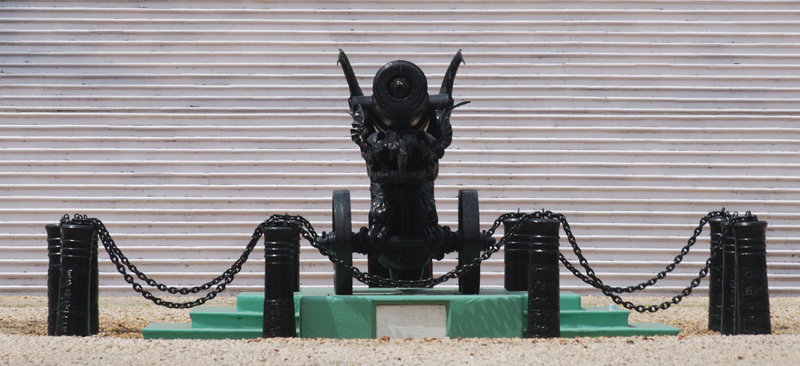
Chinese cannon, Raj Bhavan

The best view of the Raj Bhavan is obtained from the North Gate, which also serves as the main gate. The main entrance, formed by six ionic pillars supporting a pediment, is approached by a long walk past a decorated Chinese cannon presented by Edward Law, 1st Earl of Ellenborough. Mounted on a dragon and flanked with minor cannons, this cannon was a trophy taken from Nanking in 1842 after the First Opium War. An inscription on a marble plaque reads "The peace dictated to the Emperor of China under the walls of Nanking by the military force of England and of India."

== Interior ==
The three-storey Raj Bhavan building has a massive central area, consisting of large halls with curved corridors on all four sides radiating to detached wings, each constituting a house in itself. Including public halls, there are about 60 rooms in the building.

In 2017, West Bengal governor Keshari Nath Tripathi Indianised the names of these suites. The Prince of Wales suite was renamed to Rabindranath Tagore Kaksh; Wellesley Suite to Sagar Kaksh; Dufferin Suite to Kangchenjunga Kaksh; Anderson Suite to Vivekananda Kaksh.

=== Residential suites ===
The residential portion is divided into four suites. The Prince of Wales Suite in the north-west wing of the first floor hosts the President, Vice President and the Prime Minister of India and heads of state of other nations when they visit the state of West Bengal. The Wellesley Suite is located on the second floor in the north-eastern wing, the Dufferin Suite is on the second floor of north-west wing, and the fourth suite is the Anderson Suite.

=== Drawing and dining rooms ===
Yellow Drawing Room: Located on the first floor of the Raj Bhavan, adorned with many paintings.

Blue Drawing Room: An elegantly furnished room used by the governor to meet guests.

Brown Dining Room: Adjacent to the Blue Dining room, it is used for small conferences and meetings.

=== Halls and banquet rooms ===
Throne Room: The Throne Room contains the throne of Richard Wellesley. Beside it is throne of Tipu Sultan. The room contains oil paintings of Mahatma Gandhi, Subhas Chandra Bose, Jawaharlal Nehru, and Bidhan Chandra Roy. It also contains the urn used to carry Mahatma Gandhi's ashes.

Council Chamber: The Governor-General once used the Council Chamber to preside over the Executive, and later the Legislative Council. It is now used by the Governor of West Bengal to hold large meetings. A small dining room, known as the Bharat Ratna Room, and a billiard room is located just outside the Council Chamber.

The Marble Hall: Located on the ground floor of the Raj Bhavan, this Hall is used for state and private meetings.

The Banquet Hall: With rows of Doric pillars on each side, flowering chandeliers and black Mahogany tables, the Banquet Hall has entertained eminent guests such as Queen Elizabeth II.

== Picture gallery ==
=== Old photos ===
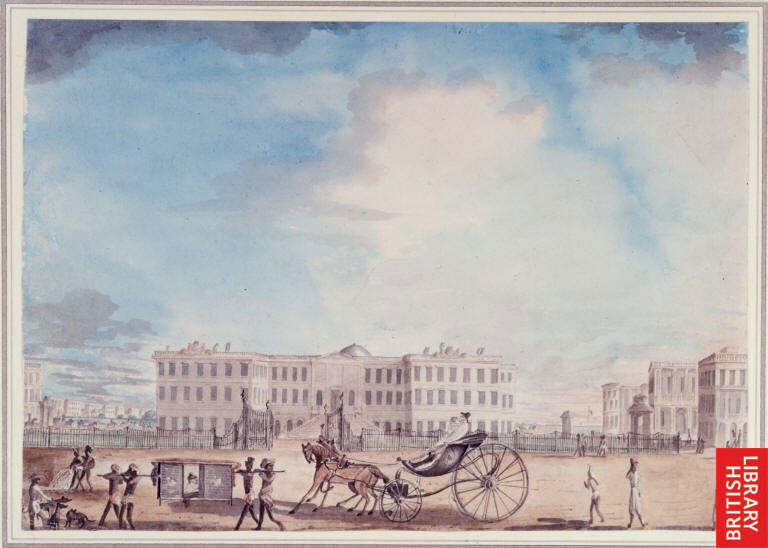
Government House, Calcutta, by John Christian Schetky

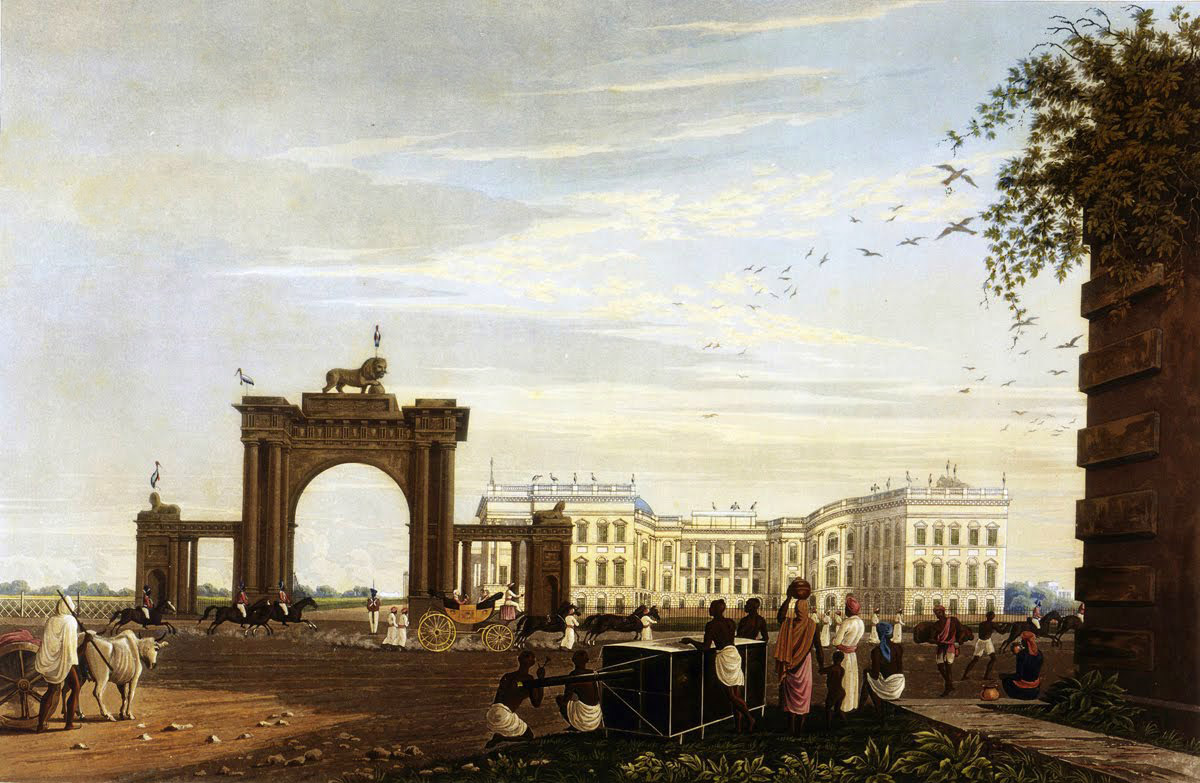
A View of the Government House from the eastern side-1819. Engraved by R Havell Jr In Views of Calcutta and its Environs by James Baillie Fraser

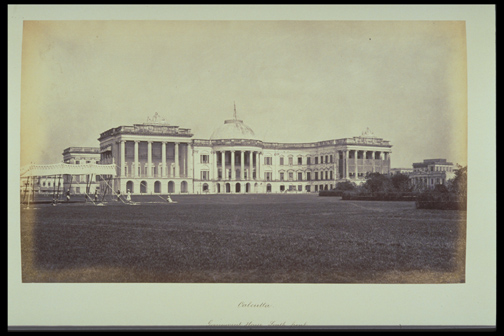
Calcutta - Government House, South Front, by Samuel Bourne

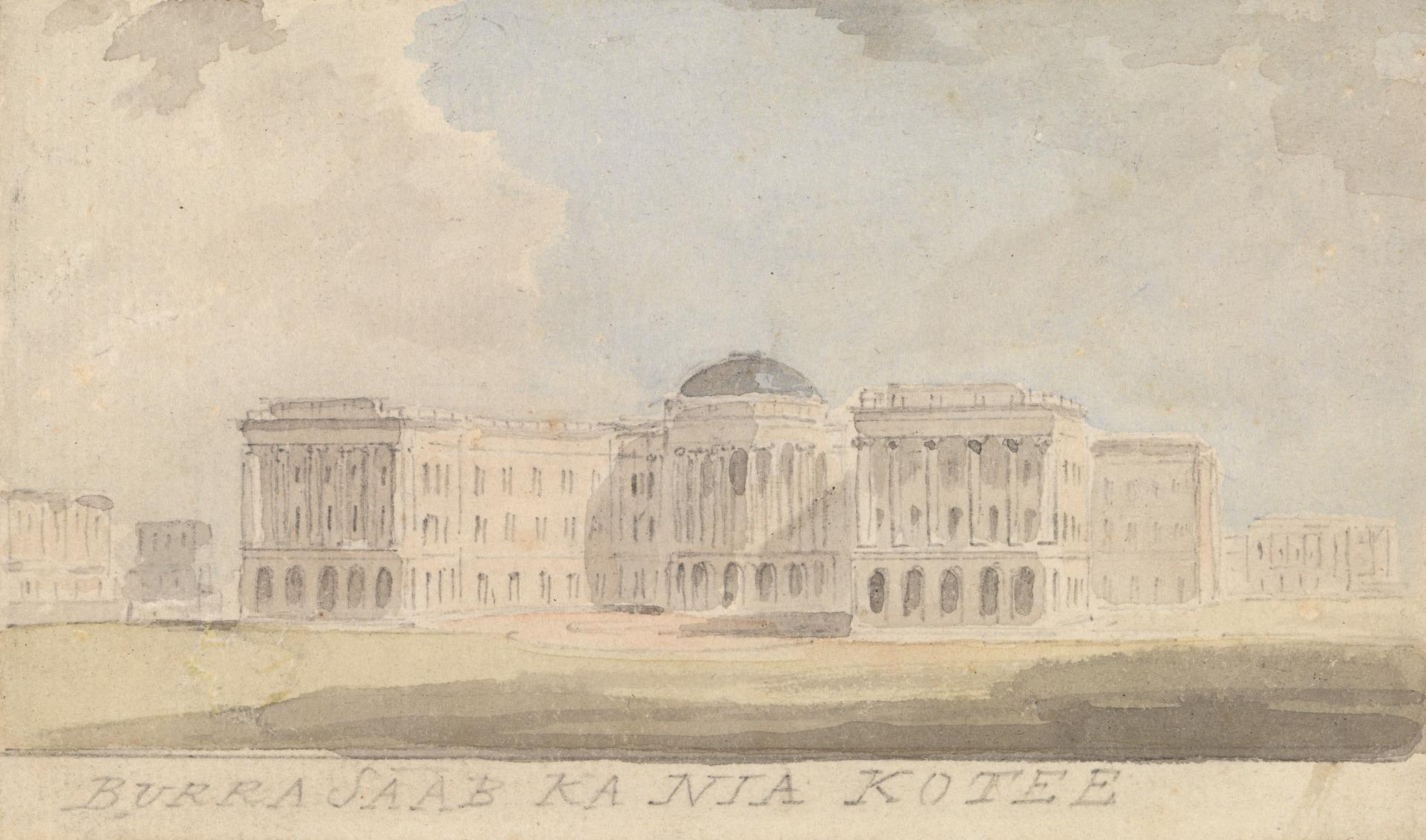
New Government House at Calcutta by Samuel Davis

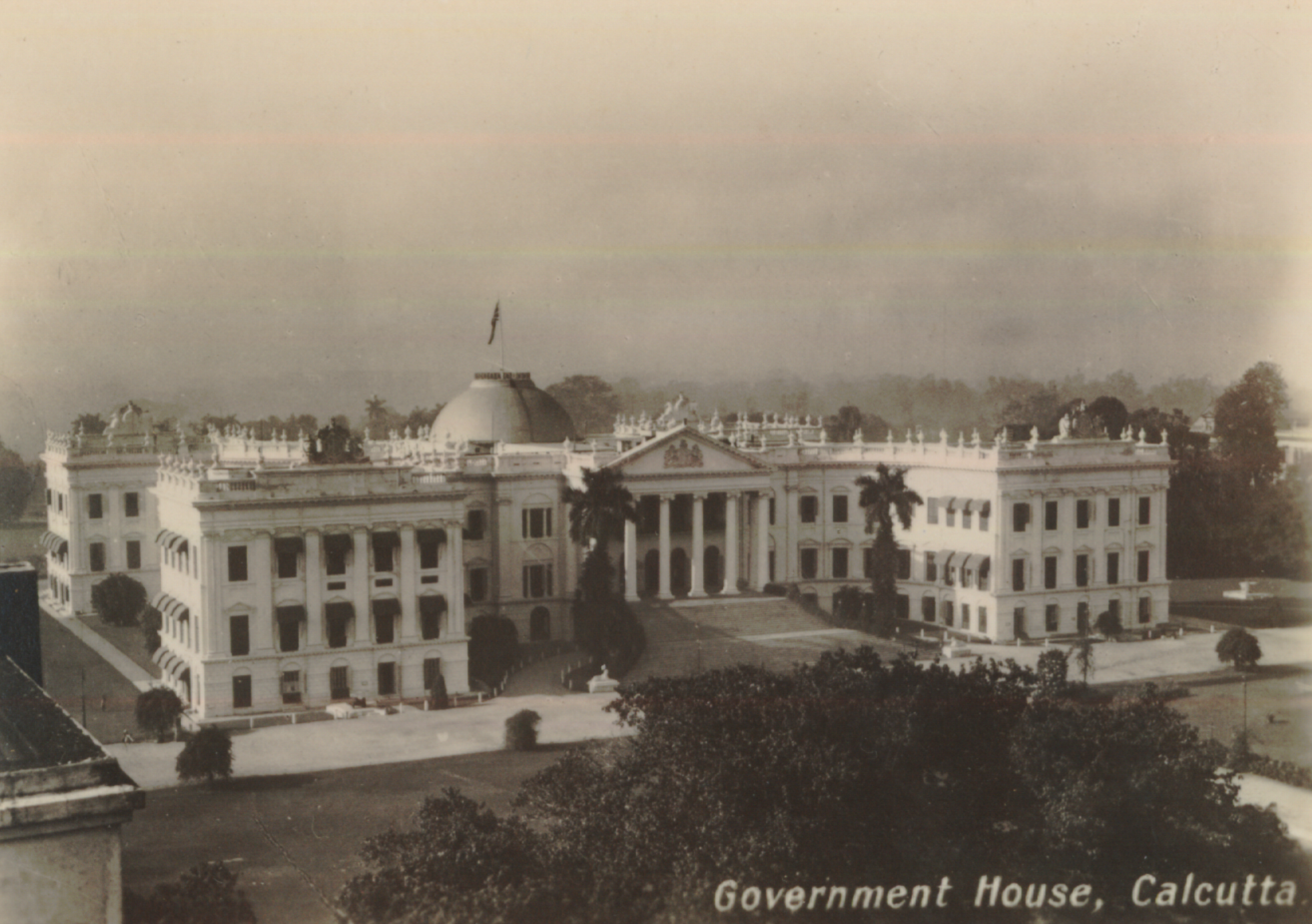
The Government House of Calcutta, bird's eye view, c. 1935

=== Present photos ===
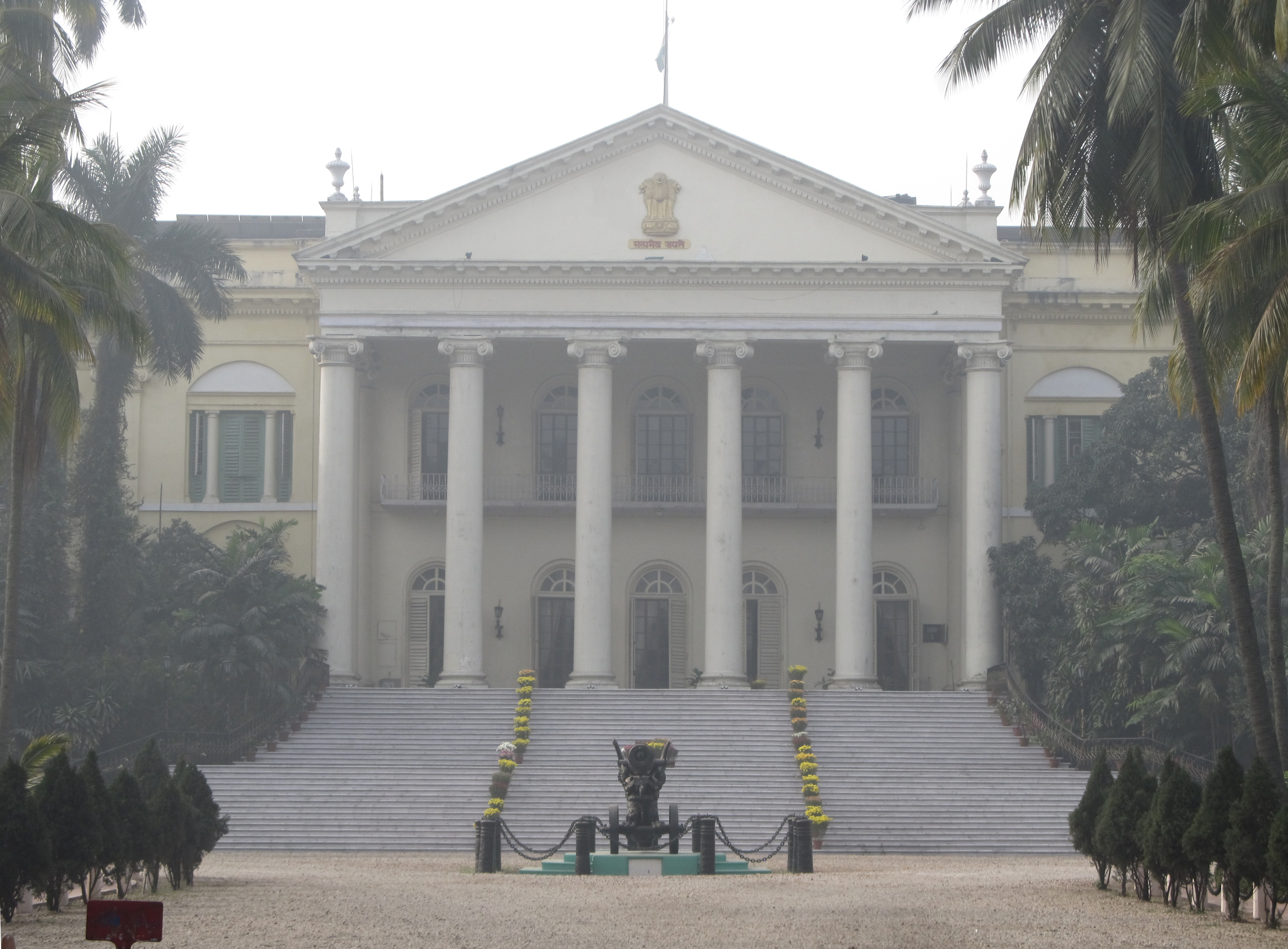
Raj Bhavan on a foggy winter morning

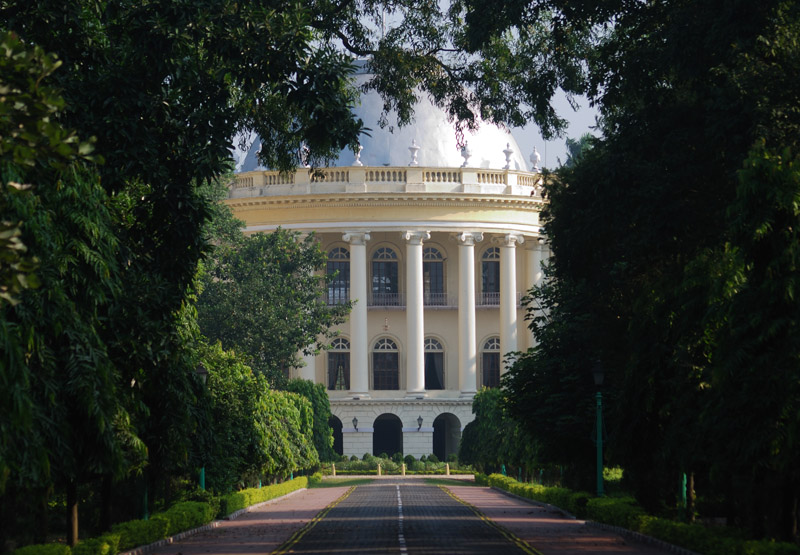
Raj Bhavan from South Gate

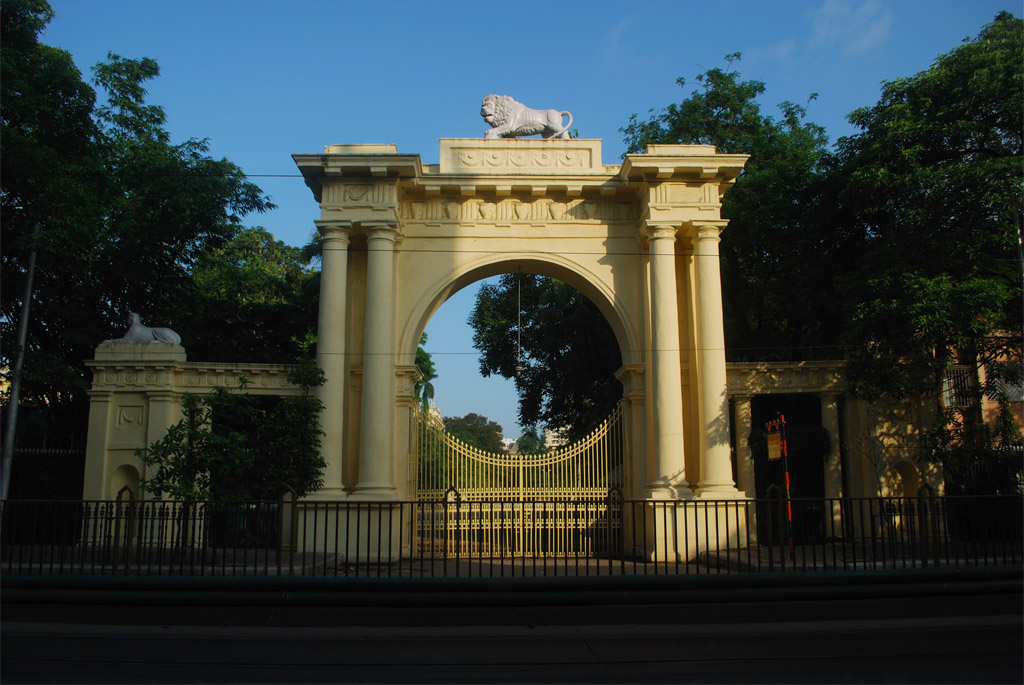
Arched gate Raj Bhavan

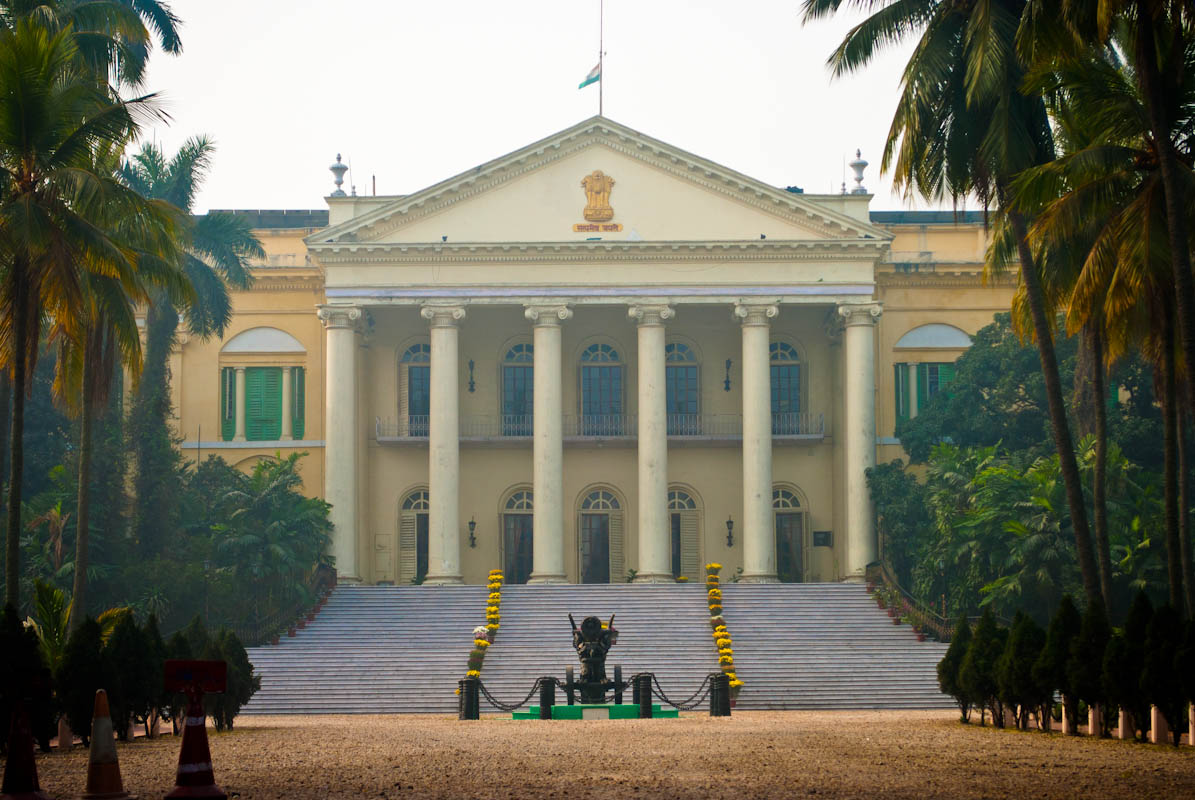
Raj Bhawan on a winter morning

== See also ==
- Government Houses of the British Indian Empire
