= 104th Regiment of Foot (1782) =

Former British Army infantry

The 104th Regiment of Foot (1782–1783) was a short-lived infantry regiment of the British Army formed from 10 independent companies (Howe's, Ashe's, Fenwick's, Jones's, Moore's, Browwne's, Wetherall's, Shillingshaw's, Campbell's, and Mall's), raised between April and July 1781. The 10 companies were designated the 104th Regiment of Foot on 24 February 1782. The companies remained scattered, principally on Guernsey, and all were brought together there in January 1783.

On 24 March 1783, 500 men of the regiment, all Irish, who were in winter quarters in Fort George, Guernsey, mutinied. The origin was possibly some discharged men from the recently disbanded 83rd Regiment who had just been sent to join the 104th on the island. The soldiers demanded that the fort gates be left open so they could come and go as they pleased. However, whilst this was agreed, the soldiers inside the fort a few days later fired at their officers forcing them to withdraw from the fort. The 18th Regiment (the Royal Irish), the Guernsey Militia, a company of regular artillery, and the Militia's artillery (with four guns and two howitzers), turned out. The rebels fired volleys, but when the militia outflanked the rebels and the rebels realized that they were surrounded, they surrendered. The Government of Guernsey gave a public thanks to the 18th Regiment and the regular artillery, awarding them 100 guineas. Two men were wounded and 36 ringleaders arrested.

In April the regiment transferred to Southampton and was disbanded there in May.

== Citations and references ==
Citations

References

- "Disbanded Regiments". Journal of the Society for Army Historical Research. 1: 92. 1921.
- Tupper, Ferdinand Brock (1876). The History of Guernsey and Its Bailiwick: With Occasional ... Guernsey: Le Liever.
