= 104th Regiment =

104th Regiment or 104th Infantry Regiment may refer to:

- 104th Infantry Regiment (United States), a unit of the US Army from Springfield, Massachusetts
- 104th Ohio Infantry, a unit of the US Army during the American Civil War
- 104th Training Aviation Regiment, a unit of the Yugoslav Air Force
- 104th Operational Maneuvers Regiment, a unit of the Algerian Army
- 104th Aviation Regiment (United States), a unit of the United States Army
- 104th Guards Air Assault Regiment, a unit of the Russian Airborne Forces
- Several infantry regiments of the British Army listed at 104th Regiment of Foot (disambiguation)

== See also ==
- 104th Division (disambiguation)
