= Richard C. Lindsay =

United States Air Force general

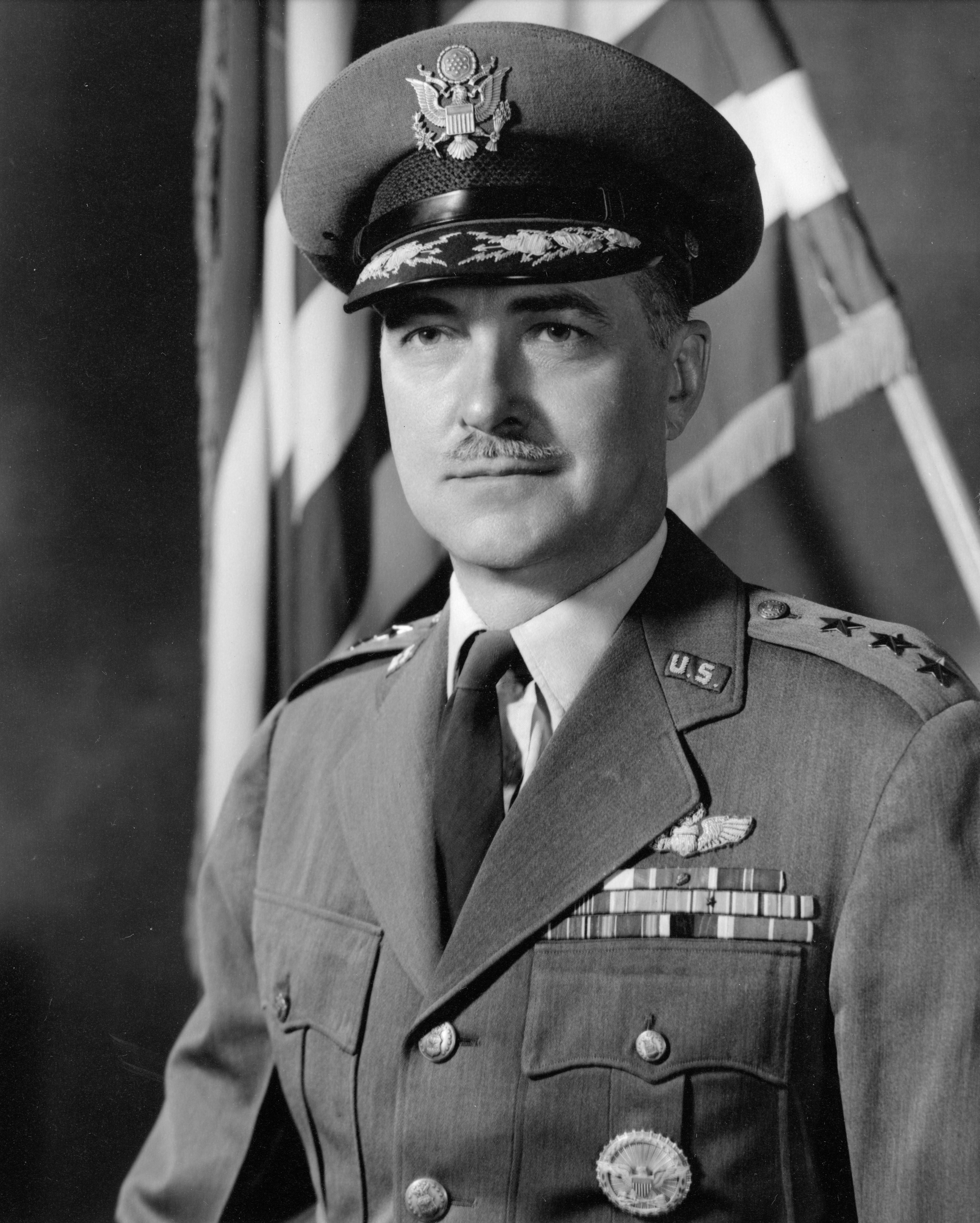
- Born: 31 October 1905; Minneapolis, Minnesota
- Died: 3 November 1990 (aged 85); Glendale, California
- Burial place: Arlington National Cemetery
- Military career
- Allegiance: United States
- Branch: United States Army (1928–1947); United States Air Force (1947–1960)
- Service years: 1928–1960
- Rank: Lieutenant General
- Service number: 0-17845
- Commands: 316th Bombardment Wing; 3560th Air Force Indoctrination Wing; Allied Air Forces Southern Europe
- Conflicts: World War II: Bombing of Japan; Occupation of Japan
- Awards: Army Distinguished Service Medal; Legion of Merit (2); Bronze Star Medal; Air Force Commendation Medal (2); Commander of the Order of the British Empire (UK)

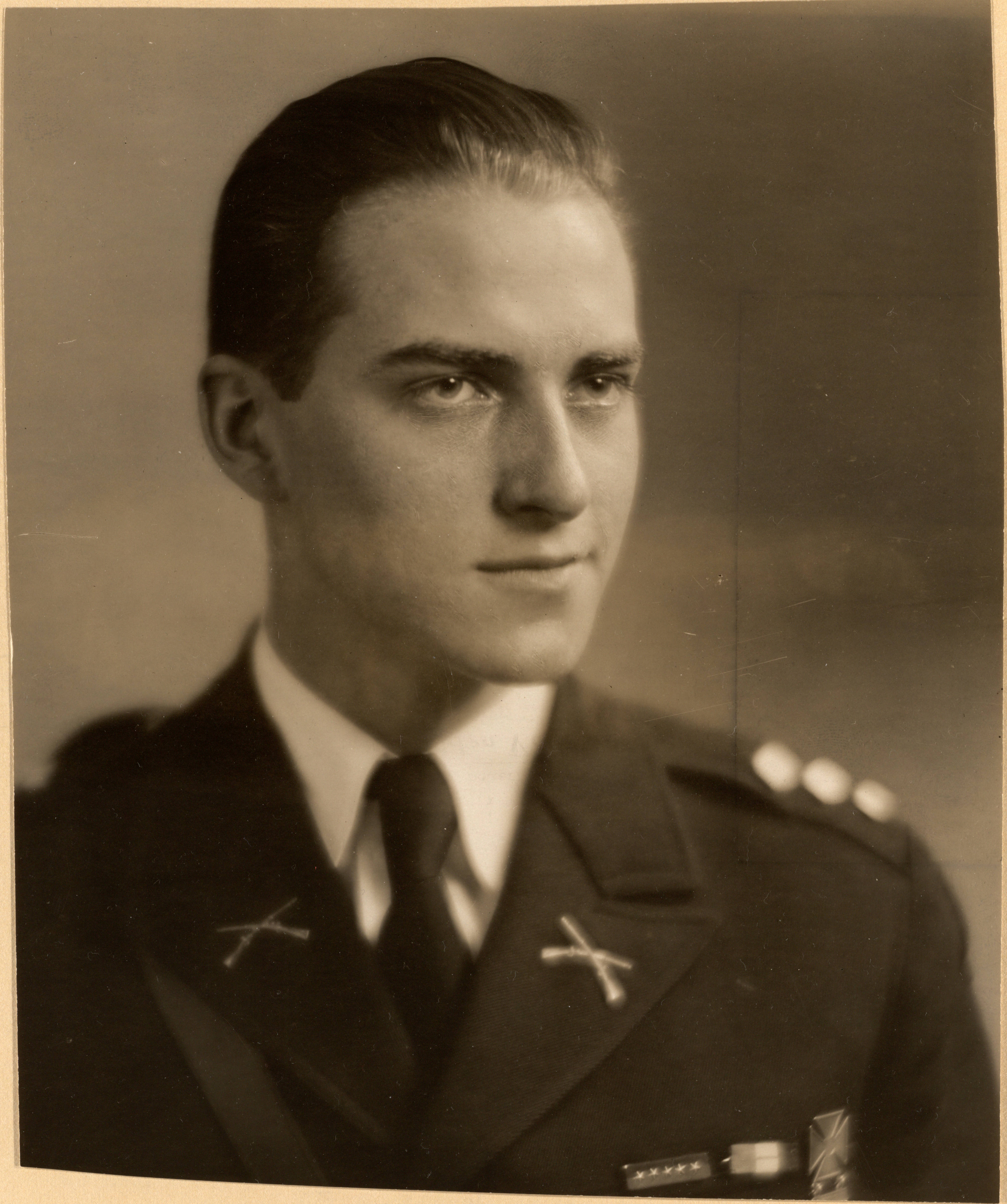
Richard Clark Lindsay

Richard Clark Lindsay (31 October 1905 – 3 November 1990) was a lieutenant general in the United States Air Force (USAF). During World War II he served in the Air War Plans Division and the Operations Division of the War Department General Staff, and on the staff of the Joint Chiefs of Staff. He served on the staff of the U.S. Army Strategic Air Forces on Guam, the Pacific Air Command in Manila and the Far East Air Forces in Tokyo, and commanded the 316th Bombardment Wing on Okinawa. From 1957 to 1960, he was the NATO commander of Allied Air Forces Southern Europe.

== Early life and career ==
Richard Clark Lindsay was born in Minneapolis, Minnesota, on 31 October 1905. He attended West High School, from which he graduated in 1924, and then Carleton College, from which he graduated in 1926, and finally the University of Minnesota, from which he graduated in 1928. He was commissioned as a reserve second lieutenant in the infantry on 11 June 1928. On 28 June 1928 he enlisted in the United States Army Air Corps. He completed the Primary and Basic Flying School at March Field, California, and from the Advanced Flying School at Kelly Field, Texas, on 27 June 1929. He was commissioned a second lieutenant in the air reserve upon graduation from Kelly, and in the Regular Army Air Corps on 14 September 1929.

Lindsay's first posting was to the 91st Observation Squadron at Crissy Field, California. He then served on temporary duty at Mather Field, California, in April and May 1930. From October 1930 to June 1931 he completed the Air Corps Tactical School Maintenance Engineering Course at Chanute Field, Illinois, and then rejoined the 91st Observation Squadron as assistant squadron engineering officer, and then as squadron engineering officer. In January 1934 he commenced the Advanced Aerial Navigation at Rockwell Field, California, but this was interrupted when the Army was called upon to deliver air mail. He flew air mail routes between Portland, Oregon, to Pasco, Washington and Boise, Idaho. He returned to the 91st Observation Squadron in October, and completed the Advanced Navigation Course the following month. He was promoted to first lieutenant on 1 March 1935.

In May 1935 he was transferred to Hamilton Field, California, where he served as navigation officer with the 9th Bombardment Squadron and the 88th Observation Squadron. He was a temporary captain from 10 August 1935 to 16 June 1936. In January 1937 he was sent to the Territory of Hawaii, where he served with the 7th Service Squadron at Schofield Barracks, the 50th Observation Squadron at Luke Field, and the 18th Wing at Hickam Field. While at Luke Field he was as a navigation and operations staff officer, and conducted a navigation school for officers in the Hawaiian Department. In late 1938 and early 1939 he was the operations officer and then the assistant operations officer of the 18th Wing. He returned to the United States in April 1939, and was assigned to the 97th Observation Squadron at Mitchel Field, New York. He was promoted to the substantive rank of captain on 4 September 1939, and attended the Air Corps Tactical School at Maxwell Field, Alabama from January to March 1940. He was assigned to the 22nd Observation Squadron at Brooks Field, Texas, where he conducted a training course for combat observers. He was promoted to major on 15 March 1941.

== World War II ==
In November 1941, Lindsay joined the War Department General Staff. He was initially assigned to the Air War Plans Division as member, and later as the chief, of the African-Middle East Section. He was promoted to lieutenant colonel on 5 January 1942. When the War Department was reorganized on 16 March 1942, he became as a member of the Policy Division of the Strategy and Policy Group in the Operations Division, the Army's global command post. He was chief of the Policy Division from 5 July 1942 to 9 May 1943, with the rank of colonel from 22 July 1942.

On 10 May 1943 Lindsay was assigned to the Joint War Plans Committee, an organ of the Joint Chiefs of Staff, serving as its chief from 1 July 1944 to 27 June 1945. In this role he was involved in the preparation of studies for used by the Joint Chiefs of Staff and the Combined Chiefs of Staff to determine the nature of operations that the Allies of World War II would carry out, and he served as the United States Army Air Forces representative on the Joint Staff Planners of the Joint Chiefs of Staff. He was promoted to brigadier general on 10 September 1944. For his service with the Joint Chiefs of Staff, he was awarded the Army Distinguished Service Medal.

In August 1945, Lindsay became Assistant Chief of Staff, A-5 (Plans), at Headquarters U.S. Army Strategic Air Forces on Guam, where he worked under General Carl Spaatz and Major General Curtis Le May, conducting Air raids on Japan. From 20 December 1945 to 17 January 1946 he was the Assistant Chief of Staff, A-5, of the Pacific Air Command in Manila. He commanded the 316th Bombardment Wing at Kadena Air Base on Okinawa from 18 January 1946 to 23 February 1947. He then moved to Tokyo, where he became the Assistant Chief of Staff, A-2 (Intelligence), for the Far East Air Forces from 24 February to 13 June 1947.

== Later life ==
Lindsay returned to the United States, where he became Chief of the Policy Division in the Office of the Assistant Chief of Staff for Plans and Operations at Army Air Forces Headquarters in Washington, D.C. Soon after, the United States Air Force was formed, and he was Chief of the Policy Division from 30 June 1947 to 18 April 1948, and its Deputy Director from 19 April 1948 to 2 October 1949, with the rank of major general from 1 November 1947. He then served once again with the Joint Chiefs of Staff, as the Air Force member of the Joint Staff Planners (later the Joint Strategic Plans Committee) from 3 October 1949 to 20 October 1950, and the Deputy Director for Strategic Plans from 1 May 1950 to 30 June 1951.

On 1 July 1951 Lindsay became the standing group liaison officer to the council deputies of the North Atlantic Treaty Organization (NATO), which was located in Washington, D.C., although the council deputies were in London. On 19 July 1952, he became commander of the 3560th Air Force Indoctrination Wing at Sampson Air Force Base, New York. In this role he supervised the basic training of Air Force recruits. He returned to Air Force headquarters in April 1954 as Director of Plans in the Office of the Deputy Chief of Staff, Operations, and became the Assistant Deputy Chief of Staff for Operations on 11 February 1957. He was promoted to lieutenant general in May 1957. His last assignment, on 1 August 1957, was as NATO commander of Allied Air Forces Southern Europe, with his headquarters in Naples, Italy. He retired on 30 April 1960.

After retiring from the Air Force Lindsay worked as a consultant for RAND Corporation and several defense contractors until 1969. He died from heart failure in a hospital in Glendale, California, where he was a long term resident, on 3 November 1990, and he was interred in Arlington National Cemetery. He was survived by his daughter Raylyn Terrell, and son, Richard B. Lindsay. His papers are held by Syracuse University.

== Military decorations ==
Distinguished Service Medal
Legion of Merit with oak leaf cluster
Bronze Star
Commendation Ribbon with oak leaf cluster
American Defense Service Medal
American Campaign Medal
Asiatic-Pacific Campaign Medal with one bronze star
European-African-Middle Eastern Campaign Medal
World War II Victory Medal
Army of Occupation Medal with "Japan" clasp
National Defense Service Medal
Commander of the Order of the British Empire (United Kingdom)

== Dates of rank ==
Insignia	Rank	Component	Date	Reference
	Second lieutenant	Infantry	11 June 1928	
	Second lieutenant	Air Corps	4 September 1929	
	First lieutenant	Air Corps	1 March 1935	
	Captain (temporary)	Air Corps	10 August 1935	
	First lieutenant	Air Corps	17 June 1936	
	Captain	Air Corps	4 September 1939	
	Major (temporary)	Air Corps	15 March 1941	
	Lieutenant colonel (temporary)	Air Corps	5 January 1942	
	Major	Army of the United States	1 February 1942	
	Colonel	Army of the United States	22 July 1942	
	Brigadier general	Army of the United States	10 September 1944	
	Major	Air Corps	4 September 1946	
	Major general (temporary)	United States Air Force	1 November 1947	
	Colonel	United States Air Force	2 April 1948	
	Brigadier general	United States Air Force	27 January 1950	
	Major general	United States Air Force	1 May 1950	
	Lieutenant general	United States Air Force	May 1957	
