= 104th Regiment of Foot (Royal Manchester Volunteers) =

Regiment of the British army (1794–1795)

The Royal Manchester Volunteers was established in 1794 and on 1 April 1794 it was taken on to the establishment of the British Army as the 104th Regiment of Foot. On 21 August 1794 General Musgrave inspected the regiment. The regiment received its colours in St Anne's Square, after which it marched to Liverpool to embark for Ireland.

The inspections at Belfast in May 1795 and Dublin in August revealed that the regiment was in a poor state. In 1795 the regiment was to be posted to the Caribbean to take part in a British invasion of Saint-Domingue. The invasion had already suffered heavy losses to yellow fever. On hearing of the plan, soldiers of the 104th Foot rioted in Dublin. The regiment was disbanded late in 1795. Some of its members were discharged and others probably went to older regiments. The colours went to the Manchester Town Hall. The expedition eventually ended in failure, defeated by the forces of the Haitian general Toussaint Louverture.
