= Canadian Volunteers =

Unit composed of pro-United States citizens

- Active: July 1813 – 15 June 1815
- Country: (United Kingdom) Upper Canada
- Allegiance: United States
- Size: Regiment (rarely exceeded company in strength)
- Engagements: Capture of Fort Niagara; Battle of Buffalo; Battle of Chippawa; Battle of Lundy's Lane; Siege of Fort Erie

Commanders
- Notable commanders: Joseph Willcocks; Abraham Markle

The Canadian Volunteers was a unit composed of pro-United States citizens or inhabitants of Upper Canada which fought for the United States of America during the Anglo-American War of 1812.

== Background ==
Before the war, Americans had been encouraged to settle in Upper Canada by generous grants of land. The Lieutenant Governors and military commanders in the province were concerned that in the event of war with America, the Americans would receive active help from many of these, and from Canadians whom they induced to support them. In March 1812, Major General Isaac Brock claimed that many of them influenced the Legislative Assembly of Upper Canada.

When the war broke out, several Canadians in the western districts of Upper Canada did indeed support the American army of Major General William Hull when it invaded Canadian territory from Detroit, though not as many as the Americans had hoped. Near York, the provincial capital, many militiamen avoided duty by marching to comparatively remote settlements such as Newmarket, where they could avoid the authorities. Brock however, induced the Executive Council to prorogue the Legislature, which had been slow to support war measures and was sometimes obstructive, and proclaim Martial Law. He then won a victory over Hull at the Siege of Detroit. No other American force successfully occupied any Canadian territory before the end of the winter. Brock's successes stiffened the resolve of many Canadians, and he was also able to issue large numbers of captured muskets to the hitherto badly armed militia units.

Brock was killed at the Battle of Queenston Heights in October, and his successor, Major General Roger Hale Sheaffe, introduced harsh restrictions against American immigrants and those expressing pro-American sentiments. During the ensuing winter, although there was no longer open disaffection, many Canadians of American origin applied for permission to return to the United States. Many others crossed into America unlawfully, across the Niagara River or across the frozen Lake Erie.

== Formation ==
In July 1813, Joseph Willcocks, a member of the Legislative Assembly of Upper Canada who had participated on the British side during the early days of the war (as an envoy to the Six Nations), defected to the Americans. Willcocks, like others who later became prominent members of the Canadian Volunteers, was not a recent American immigrant to Upper Canada, but believed that the harsh measures taken against those considered to be disloyal by the military authorities violated natural justice and the rule of law. He was commissioned as major in the United States Army and formed the Canadian Volunteers at Fort George, which the Americans had captured in May.

== Service in the War of 1812 ==
By the autumn, the corps numbered about 120 men. During the later part of 1813, they were active as skirmishers, foragers and scouts around the Fort.

In November, the corps was reinforced by more volunteers under Benajah Mallory, another former member of the Upper Canada Legislature, who became second in command with the rank of major. (Willcocks held the rank of lieutenant colonel by this time).

=== Raid and Burning of Newark ===
By December 1813, almost all the United States regular troops had been withdrawn from Fort George. Faced with a British advance, Brigadier General George McClure of the New York State Militia ordered the post to be abandoned. During the evacuation, he gave an order to set fire to the nearby village of Newark. On 10 December 1813, Joseph Willcocks led 100 members of his corps and 70 U.S. Regulars to the village, where they burned down more than 60 structures of public and private property. Willcocks recruited four Canadians who joined him, then withdrew to New York with 24 prisoners. This operation left approximately 400 Canadian civilians without shelter at the height of winter. Other houses in Queenston were also burned down by the Americans. This outrage caused much resentment in the Canadian population, which until then had been somewhat lethargic in opposing the invasion.

=== Battle of Lewiston ===
On 19 December, the British stormed Fort Niagara and launched a reprisal raid into New York under Major General Phineas Riall. In the Battle of Lewiston, Canadian Volunteers under Major Benajah Mallory conducted a fighting retreat for two days, contesting every inch of ground as they fell back to the Tonawanda Creek, where they set fire to the bridge over the unfordable creek to halt the British pursuit. Eight of the Canadian Volunteers were killed.

Some at least of the Canadian Volunteers fought in the Battle of Buffalo near the end of the year, when the British launched another punitive expedition across the upper part of the Niagara.

=== Raid on Port Dover ===
During the spring of 1814, the unit enrolled more recruits and reorganised. Abraham Markle, yet another former member of the Legislature, became a company commander. In May, Markle accompanied the American Raid on Port Dover, in which the village was burned down. Markle witnessed the destruction of the property of Robert Nichol, who had moved for Markle's expulsion from the Legislature.

=== Battle of Chippawa ===
During July, the Canadian Volunteers, which was listed as a regiment but little stronger than a company, formed part of a brigade of militia volunteers commanded by Brigadier General Peter Buell Porter in the American army on the Niagara. They fought at the Battle of Chippawa

=== Raid on Saint David's ===
On 22 July 1814, Joseph Willcocks led 200-300 men, including American dragoons, in a surprise raid on Saint David's where there were four Canadian militiamen. Willcocks was the only Canadian in this force. They surrounded the house where the Canadian militiamen were staying but the Canadians fired muskets through the windows, killing one American dragoon and wounding a few horses. They fought on until the American dragoon Captain Harrison stepped forward into the open and persuaded them to surrender. Willcocks and his fellow American raiders destroyed their house and withdrew to American territory with their four prisoners.

=== Battle of Lundy's Lane ===
The Canadian Volunteers fought at the Battle of Lundy's Lane. After this battle, the depleted Americans withdrew to Fort Erie.

=== Siege of Fort Erie ===
During the ensuing Siege of Fort Erie, Brigadier General Porter departed for three weeks to recruit fresh volunteers from the militia, and Lieutenant Colonel Willcocks assumed command of his brigade. On September 4, 1814, during the Siege of Fort Erie. Joseph Willocks led a sortie against a British battery. After 6 hours of fighting, the sortie force under Joseph Wilocks withdrew after Joseph got shot in the chest and killed. Abraham Markle succeeded to command of the Canadian Volunteers.

== Other Canadians in U.S. service ==
Other Canadian renegades, not officially part of the Canadian Volunteers, were attached to the American garrisons at Amherstburg and Detroit. They accompanied or instigated many foraging expeditions or punitive raids against undefended Canadian settlements, and caused much hardship.

== Disbandment ==
At the end of the war, the Canadian Volunteers were disbanded on 15 June 1815 at Batavia, New York. As most of them were wanted for treason, it was impossible for them to return to their former properties or occupations in Upper Canada (although some at least tried to do so). All Canadians who had performed military service for the United States were indemnified by the United States Congress for their losses, and were rewarded for their services with grants of land in the United States territory, in proportion to their rank.
