= Raid on Port Dover =

1814 American raid during the War of 1812

Coordinates: 42.7962°N 80.2173°W

- Part of the War of 1812
Date	14–16 May 1814
Location	Port Dover, Norfolk County, Upper Canada (now Ontario, Canada)
Result	American victory

Belligerents
United States	United Kingdom; Upper Canada

Commanders and leaders
John B. Campbell	Unknown

Strength
750 regulars and militia	Scattered elements of militia and regular units

Casualties and losses
Unknown	Unknown; Port Dover destroyed

The Raid on Port Dover was an episode during the War of 1812. American troops crossed Lake Erie to capture or destroy stocks of grain and destroy mills at Port Dover in Upper Canada, which were used to provide flour for British troops stationed on the Niagara Peninsula. At the instigation of Lieutenant Colonel John B. Campbell and without sanction from his superiors or the government of the United States, the Americans also destroyed private houses and other property, prompting British commanders to demand reprisals in other theatres of the war. To some degree, the burning of Washington by the British later in the year was influenced by the American actions at Port Dover.

== Background ==
In the spring of 1814, the Americans were preparing to make an attack across the Niagara River. As the Americans held undisputed control of Lake Erie, the troops at Presque Isle on the lake's southern shore were no longer needed to protect the improvised shipyard there, and were ordered to join the main American army at Buffalo, New York.

The idea of raiding the Canadian settlements near Long Point and destroying the mills there en route to Buffalo occurred both to Captain Arthur Sinclair, commanding the armed vessels of the United States Navy on Lake Erie, and Lieutenant Colonel John B. Campbell, commanding the troops at Presque Isle. (Note: Campbell had been promoted and appointed Colonel of the 11th U.S. Infantry, but word of this promotion had not reached Presque Isle, as Sinclair referred to him by his previous rank and appointment as Lieutenant Colonel of the 19th U.S. Infantry on 13 May.)

It took some days to assemble the expedition, in particular to obtain volunteers from the Pennsylvania Militia, and Sinclair later considered that the delay and publicity prevented the raid from achieving surprise. On 13 May 750 troops, composed of detachments of regulars (including artillery) and Pennsylvania militia, were embarked aboard Sinclair's ships. The expedition was accompanied by several renegade Canadian guides, including Abraham Markle.

== Raid ==
In the late afternoon of 14 May, the Americans landed near Port Dover. There was a minor skirmish between American militiamen and some Canadian militiamen who were trying to remove goods from a storehouse.

The Americans remained where they had disembarked during the night of 14 May. The next day, they marched to the village, where they drew up in formal line of battle, although there was no opposition. On Campbell's orders they then set fire to every building in the settlement: twenty houses, three flour mills, three sawmills, three distilleries, twelve barns and some other buildings. All livestock was shot, and their bodies left to rot. Some of Sinclair's sailors took the hind ends of the slaughtered hogs, but other than these opportune thefts, there was no plundering. Although the local women and children were allowed to remove their personal possessions from their houses before they were set on fire, they were able to remove only small items.

Much of the property destroyed had belonged to Robert Nichol, who was noted for his support for the British authorities, at the instigation of Markle, who had been expelled from the local Legislative Assembly by Nichol.

The Americans then re-embarked, but landed again the next day to burn another mill and a sawmill. They then returned to Presque Isle. During the entire raid, the only opposition had been some scattered Canadian militia, and a troop of the 19th Light Dragoons. The British had either received word of the impending raid, or had taken precautions against the possibility, and almost all the flour in the settlement (several hundred barrels) had already been removed to safety.

== Aftermath ==
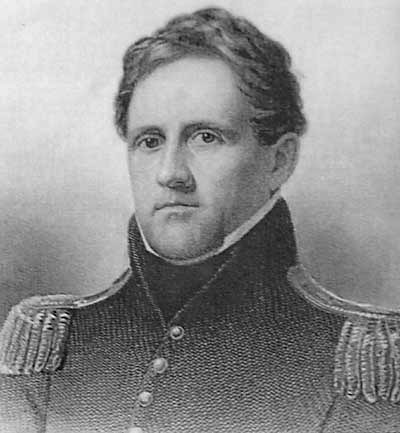
Brig Gen Winfield Scott presided over the Court of Enquiry against Lt Col John Campbell, after protest prompted the United States Army initiate an inquiry.

Sinclair and several other American officers (particularly among the militia) were enraged by Campbell's actions. Campbell insisted, both at the time and subsequently in a note to the British Major General Phineas Riall, commanding the division on the Niagara Peninsula, that he personally ordered the destruction without any sanction from his superiors or the United States government, in retaliation for the burning of the American settlements of Havre de Grace (on the Chesapeake Bay), Lewiston and Buffalo the previous year.

The official notes of protest from Riall and complaints by Sinclair and other Americans prompted the United States Army to hold a Court of Enquiry, presided over by Brigadier General Winfield Scott, on 20 June. The court concluded that Campbell was justified in burning the mills and distilleries which might have been used to supply flour and spirits to the British forces, and that some adjacent buildings were unavoidably involved. However, Campbell was found to have made an error of judgement in destroying private houses and other buildings. No further disciplinary action was taken at the time, and Campbell was mortally wounded at the Battle of Chippawa on 5 July.

=== British response ===
Lieutenant General Sir George Prevost, the Governor General of the Canadas and commander in chief of the forces there, wrote on 2 June to Vice Admiral Sir Alexander Cochrane, commander of the North American Station of the Royal Navy, without noting that Campbell had not acted under orders:

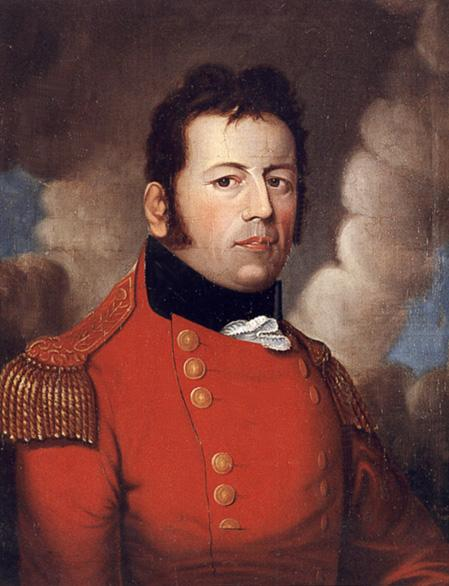
After the raid, George Prevost, the Governor General of the Canadas wrote to the commander of the Chesapeake campaign, Alexander Cochrane, advising him to inflict "a measure of retaliation which shall deter the enemy from a repetition of similar outrages."

...in consequence of the late disgraceful conduct of the American troops in the wanton destruction of private property on the north shores of Lake Erie, in order that if the war with the United States continues you may, should you judge it advisable, assist in inflicting that measure of retaliation which shall deter the enemy from a repetition of similar outrages.

Cochrane in turn wrote from his station in Bermuda on 18 June to John Wilson Croker, the Secretary to the Admiralty:

I am most decidedly of opinion that the readiest way to attain this object is to bring home to the supporters of the Government which authorizes this unnatural system of warfare a full share of its dreadful calamities and to this end, I have issued to the commanding officer of H.M. blockading squadron an order, accompanied by a secret memorandum...

ORDER FOR RETALIATION
No. 1
By the Honorable [sic] Alexander Cochrane, K.B. &c, &c, &c.

Whereas... it appears that the American troops in Upper Canada have committed the most wanton and unjustifiable outrages on the unoffending inhabitants by burning their mills and houses, and by a general devastation of private property...

You are hereby required and directed to destroy and lay waste such towns and districts as you may find assailable. You will hold strictly in view the conduct of the American army towards His Majesty's unoffending Canadian subjects and you will spare merely the lives of the unarmed inhabitants of the United States.

In the appended secret memorandum, Cochrane modified these severe orders by instructing his commanders to spare places which furnished supplies to British ships or troops, or to levy contributions in return for forbearance, in proportion to the value of goods and buildings spared. This code of conduct was followed by the British during the Raid on Alexandria.

== Sources ==
- Gilbert Collins (2006). Guidebook to the Historic Sites of the War of 1812. Dundurn Group. ISBN 978-1-55002-626-9.
- Cruikshank, Ernest A. (1964). "The County of Norfolk in the War of 1812". In Zaslow, Morris (ed.). The Defended Border: Upper Canada and the War of 1812. Macmillan of Canada. OCLC 480289.
- Elting, John R. (22 August 1995). Amateurs to Arms. New York: Da Capo Press. ISBN 0-306-80653-3.
- Hitsman, J. Mackay (1999). The Incredible War of 1812. Robin Brass Studio. ISBN 1-896941-13-3.
