= Benajah Mallory =

Canadian-American paramilitary leader (1764-1853)

Benajah Mallory (ca 1764 – August 9, 1853) was a farmer, merchant and political figure in Upper Canada.

He was born in the Thirteen Colonies around 1764; he was living in Vermont at the start of the American Revolution and served with the local militia. He married Abia Dayton and settled in Burford Township in Upper Canada with his father-in-law and others. When his father-in-law died, he became the community's leader. In 1798, he became a captain in the York Militia. He was elected to the 4th Parliament of Upper Canada representing Norfolk, Oxford and Middlesex in 1804 and was elected to the following parliament for Oxford and Middlesex. In 1806, he was appointed justice of the peace in the London District. In 1812, with Joseph Willcocks, he resisted efforts by Isaac Brock to pass legislation preparing for war with the United States. After Brock dissolved parliament, Mallory was defeated by Mahlon Burwell in the subsequent election.

== War of 1812 ==
In 1813, Mallory joined the Canadian Volunteers, a militia formed by Willcocks which fought for the American side during the War of 1812. When Willcocks died during the Siege of Fort Erie in 1814, Mallory was given command of this unit. Mallory was convicted of treason in absentia and his lands in Upper Canada reverted to the Crown.

=== Battle of Lewiston ===
On 19 December, the British stormed Fort Niagara and launched a raid into New York under Major General Phineas Riall. In the Battle of Lewiston, Canadian Volunteers under Major Benajah Mallory conducted a fighting retreat for two days, contesting every inch of ground as they fell back to the Tonawanda Creek, where they set fire to the bridge over the unfordable creek to halt the British pursuit. Eight of the Canadian Volunteers were killed.

== Later life ==
He later settled in Lockport, New York. In 1838, he offered to help William Lyon Mackenzie and his followers on Navy Island. He died at Lockport in 1853.
