= John B. Campbell =

US Army officer (1777–1814)

- Born: March 13, 1777; Virginia
- Died: August 28, 1814 (aged 37); Chippawa, Ontario
- Relatives: Colonel Arthur Campbell General William Campbell
- Military career
- Allegiance: United States of America
- Branch: United States Army
- Service years: 1812 - 1814
- Rank: Colonel
- Unit: 19th U.S. Infantry 11th U.S. Infantry
- Commands: 11th U.S. Infantry
- Conflicts: War of 1812: Battle of the Mississinewa; Raid on Port Dover; Capture of Fort Erie; Battle of Chippewa

John B. Campbell (March 13, 1777– August 28, 1814) was an American soldier during the War of 1812, famous for his expedition to destroy the Miami Native American villages along the Mississinewa River and perhaps most infamous for ordering the destruction of private houses and other property in Dover, Canada, including the stocks of grain and mills, which led to a Court of Enquiry and an unprecedented letter to the enemy explaining himself. He was mortally wounded at the Battle of Chippawa in July.

== Early life and career ==
Campbell was born in Virginia. However, his family moved to Kentucky about 1807, and he became a lawyer in Hopkinsville, Kentucky. He was a son of Colonel Arthur Campbell, a soldier of the Revolutionary War and Indian Wars whom Campbell County, Tennessee was named after, and a nephew of General William Campbell. His brother, James H. Campbell, died also in the War of 1812 at Mobile, Alabama.

== War of 1812 ==
=== Western Frontier ===
On March 12, 1812, he was appointed from Kentucky as lieutenant-colonel of the 19th infantry. He was brevetted colonel on Dec. 18, 1812, for gallant conduct while commanding a detachment in the campaign against the Mississineway Indians. On April 9, 1814, he was promoted colonel and transferred to the 11th infantry.

=== Canada ===
After the Raid on Port Dover, British Major General Phineas Riall addressed the commanding officer of the United States troops by letter, asking explicitly if the landing and the "acts of outrage on private property" at Port Dover were authorised by the United States military. The answer came under General Jacob Brown's seal, but without any communication from Brown. Instead, it was a letter from "Colonel John B. Campbell, of the 11th Regiment United States troops," possibly the only instance of such correspondence between officers of opposing armies in time of war.

Niagara Frontier, 16 June 1814.

Sir,—I have the honour to receive your communication of the 9th current. I commanded the detachment of the United States army which lately made a landing at Dover on lake Erie. What was done at that place and its vicinity proceeded from my orders. The whole business was planned by myself and executed upon my own responsibility.

Colonel Campbell also commanded the 11th Infantry Regiment in the Capture of Fort Erie. He was mortally wounded at the Battle of Chippewa, Canada, July 5, 1814, where he commanded the right wing of Brigadier General Winfield Scott's army. He died on August 28, 1814.
