= 6th Parliament of Upper Canada =

Parliament for Upper Canada 1812–1816

The 6th Parliament of Upper Canada was the composition of the Parliament of Upper Canada between June 1812 and April 1816. Following the Westminster model, it consisted of

- The Crown of the United Kingdom, as represented by the Lieutenant Governor of Upper Canada, Francis Gore, and six administrators acting in his absence from 1812 to 1815, and advised by the Executive Council of Upper Canada
- the appointed members of the Legislative Council of Upper Canada that were in office during that time
- members elected to the House of Assembly of Upper Canada in elections held in June 1812.

The previous was dissolved by Isaac Brock, the administrator of the colonial government, on 1 May 1812 and election was held in June. These events were slightly ahead of schedule and were triggered by Brock being frustrated in his efforts to pass legislation preparing the colony for war with the United States. On 12 July, an American army under Brigadier General William Hull crossed the Detroit River and occupied Sandwich (later known as Windsor). The incursion provided Brock with a compelling reason to convene the 6th Parliament in the last week of July for an extraordinary session. Approval for Brock's defense measures was quickly obtained, and Brock prorogued parliament on 5 August and set out on 6 August for the front line.

While references to "parliament" in modern Canadian and British political discourse generally refer to the elected chamber of the legislature, the elected assembly of Upper Canada wielded relatively little power relative to the unelected legislative council and was afforded little deference by either the Lieutenant Governor or the Legislative Council. Accordingly, the Crown and the upper house were both significant elements of parliaments in its role as the legislature of the colony.

== Sessions ==
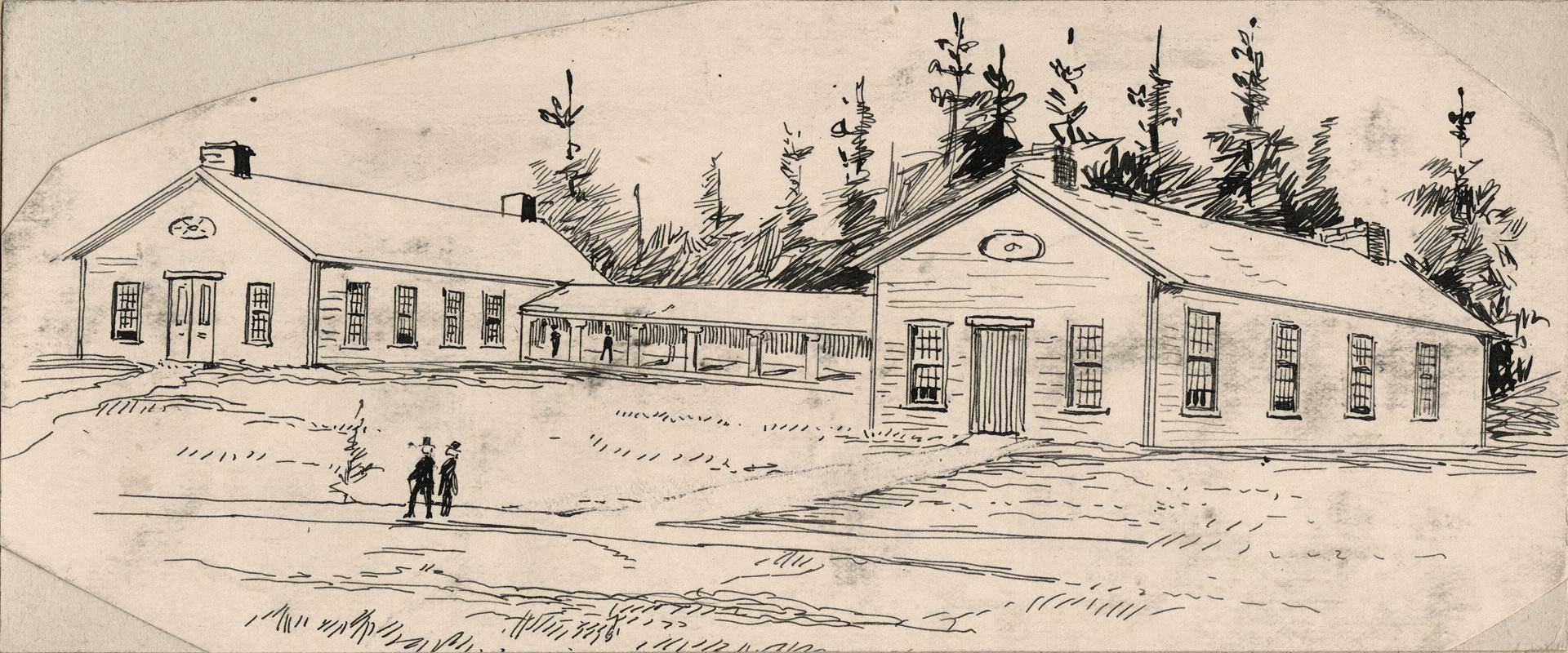
The first dedicated parliamentary buildings for the Legislature of Upper Canada was completed in 1794, although it was later destroyed after the Battle of York in 1813.

The 6th Parliament convened for over five sessions. In addition to the brief extraordinary session in later July 1812, it held regular sessions between February and March of each of the years 1813, 1814, 1815, and 1816.All sessions were held in York, Upper Canada (now City of Toronto).

The first and second sessions were held at the Palace of Parliament located at the intersection of Front Street and Parliament Street (Parliament Street was so named for that reason, though Front Street abutted the bay at the time). It would be the last parliament to be in session at the site. The Palace of Parliament was set ablaze and destroyed by American Troops in the plundering following the Battle of York on 27 April 1813.

The House of Assembly then met once in 1814 in the ballroom of Jordan's York Hotel (about two blocks away from the previous site, on the south side of King Street East, west of Parliament Street). It then held session at the home of Chief Justice of Upper Canada William Henry Draper at the northwest corner of Wellington Street and York Street for the remainder of this parliament. This parliament was dissolved 18 April 1816.

This House of Assembly of the 6th Parliament sat in five sessions 27 July 1812 to 1 April 1816:

| Sessions | Start | End |
|---|---|---|
| 1st | 27 July 1812 | 5 August 1812 |
| 2nd | 25 February 1813 | 13 March 1813 |
| 3rd | 15 February 1814 | 14 March 1814 |
| 4th | 1 February 1815 | 14 March 1815 |
| 5th | 6 February 1816 | 1 April 1816 |

No known copies of the journals for the first (1812), second (1813) and fourth (1815) sessions of this parliament have survived to the present day. Accordingly, some aspect of the 6th Parliament cannot be definitely explained or determined.

== Composition ==
The House of assembly remained at 25 seats, with some slight redistribution of electoral division.

| 1792 districts (Note: Upper Canada went through numerous iteration of district redistribution, some of the changes were transitory and with very narrow focus. Inclusion of all would detract rather than serve the purpose of showing geographical groupings of the electoral divisions. Districts that were created and in effect at the time are included in brackets for reference.) | Electoral divisions in 5th Parliament | Electoral divisions in 6th Parliament |
|---|---|---|
| Home (Niagara) | West York | West York, Saltfleet, Ancaster (duo-member) |
| Home (Niagara) | 1st Lincoln & Haldimand (duo member) | West York, Saltfleet, Ancaster (duo-member) |
| Home (Niagara) | 1st Lincoln & Haldimand (duo member) | 1st Lincoln |

== Members ==
=== House of Assembly ===
| Riding | Member | First elected/ previously elected | No. of terms |
|---|---|---|---|
| Dundas | John Crysler | 1804, 1812 | 2nd term* |
| Essex | Richard Pattinson | 1812 | 1st term |
| Essex | William McCormick | 1812 | 1st term |
| Frontenac | Allan McLean – Speaker 1813–1816 | 1804 | 3rd term |
| Glengarry | Alexander McMartin | 1812 | 1st term |
| Glengarry | John Macdonell | 1812 | 1st term |
| Glengarry | Alexander Macdonell (1812) | 1800, 1812 | 4th term* |
| Grenville | Gideon Adams | 1812 | 1st term |
| Hastings & Ameliasburgh Township | James Young | 1812 | 1st term |
| Kent | John McGregor | 1804 | 3rd term |
| Leeds | Levius Peters Sherwood | 1812 | 1st term |
| Lennox & Addington | Benjamin Fairfield | 1812 | 1st term |
| Lennox & Addington | Timothy Thompson | 1812 | 1st term |
| 1st Lincoln County | Joseph Willcocks (deserted) | 1808 | 3rd term |
| 1st Lincoln County | Robert Nelles (Feb 1816) | 1816 | 1st term |
| 2nd Lincoln | Ralfe Clench | 1796, 1812 | 3rd term* |
| 3rd Lincoln | Thomas Dickson | 1812 | 1st term |
| 4th Lincoln | John Fanning | 1812 | 1st term |
| 4th Lincoln | Isaac Swayze (Feb 1814) | 1792, 1804, 1814 | 4th term* |
| Norfolk | Robert Nichol | 1812 | 1st term |
| Northumberland and Durham | David McGregor Rogers | 1800 | 4th term |
| Oxford & Middlesex | Mahlon Burwell | 1812 | 1st term |
| Prescott | Thomas Mears | 1808 | 2nd term |
| Prince Edward except Ameliasburgh Township | John Stinson | 1811 | 2nd term |
| Stormont & Russell | John Beikie | 1812 | 1st term |
| East York & Simcoe | Thomas Ridout | 1812 | 1st term |
| West York | Abraham Markle (deserted to US) | 1812 | 1st term |
| West York | James Durand (Feb 1815) | 1815 | 1st term |

=== Legislative Council ===
The Legislative Council was the appointed upper house of the parliament. It held veto power over all legislations passed by the elected assembly and exercised it regularly with little deference to assembly democratic mandate. Members were appointed for life (but were subject to removal for non-attendance), therefore the date for the end of their term were usually the date of their death.

| Member | Town | Appointed | Term ended | Notes |
|---|---|---|---|---|
| James Baby | Sandwich | 12 July 1792 | 19 February 1833 | |
| Richard Cartwright | Kingston | 12 July 1792 | 27 July 1815 | Died during this parliament |
| Alexander Grant, Sr. | York | 12 July 1792 | 8 May 1813 | Also a member of the Executive Council, died during this parliament |
| Æneas Shaw | York | 19 June 1794 | 6 February 1814 | Died during this parliament |
| Jacob Mountain | Quebec City | 1 July 1794 | 25 June 1825 | Member ex officio Anglican Bishop of Quebec, did not attend any sitting |
| John McGill | York | 10 June 1797 | 31 December 1834 | Also a member of the Executive Council; Inspector General (1801–13); Auditor General of Land Patents (1813–18) |
| Thomas Scott | York | 7 August 1806 | 29 July 1824 | Speaker of council ex officio Chief Justice of the Court of King's Bench (1806–16) |
| Thomas Talbot | Port Talbot | 1 September 1809 | 10 February 1841 | |
| William Claus | Niagara | 1 February 1812 | 11 November 1826 | |
| Thomas Clark | Chippawa | 16 November 1815 | 13 October 1835 | Member of the House of Assembly in the 2nd and 5th Parliament |
| William Dickson | Niagara | 16 November 1815 | 10 February 1841 | Council was dissolved in 1841. |
| Thomas Fraser | Ernestown | 16 November 1815 | 1819 | Status unknown after 1819; died in South Dundas, Ontario in 1821 |
| Neil McLean | Cornwall | 16 November 1815 | | Never attended |
| William Dummer Powell | York | 21 March 1816 | 6 September 1834 | Also a member of the Executive Council, succeeded Thomas Scott as Chief Justice during this parliament. |

=== Officers of Parliament ===
| Office | Office holders |
|---|---|
| Lieutenant Governor of Upper Canada | Francis Gore (in office 1806–1817, absent 1811–1815) Administrator acting in Gore's absence: Sir Isaac Brock (1811–1812); Sir Roger Hale Sheaffe, 1st Baronet (1812–1813); Sir Francis de Rottenburg (Note: de Rottenburg, born to a German household in Polish–Lithuanian Commonwealth as von Rottenburg but adopted the surname de Rottenburg while in service to the French army, was sometimes referred to as Baron de Rottenburg. The origin or the authenticity of the title remains unconfirmed.) (1813); Sir Gordon Drummond (1813–1814); Sir George Murray (1815); Sir Frederick Philipse Robinson (1815) |
| Speaker of the House of Assembly | Hon. Allan McLean, Esq. |
| Speaker of the Legislative Council ex officio Chief Justice of the Court of King's Bench | Thomas Scott (1806–1816) William Dummer Powell (1816–1825) |
| Clerk of the House of Assembly | Donald McLean (May 1801 – May 1813) Grant Powell (May 1813 – May 1821) |
| Sergeant-at-Arms | Allan MacNab (Note: Father of future Joint Premier of Canada Allan Napier MacNab) (1813-1828) |
| Librarian and Keeper of the records | George Mayer |

== See also ==
- Legislative Council of Upper Canada
- Executive Council of Upper Canada
- Legislative Assembly of Upper Canada
- Lieutenant Governors of Upper Canada, 1791-1841
- Historical federal electoral districts of Canada
- List of Ontario provincial electoral districts
