= Thomas Dickson (Upper Canada politician) =

Canadian politician

Thomas Dickson (ca. 1775 – January 22, 1825) was a businessman and political figure in Upper Canada.

He was born in Dumfries, Scotland around 1775. When his father's business encountered financial hardship, Thomas and his brothers travelled to Upper Canada to seek work with their cousin Robert Hamilton. In 1793, Dickson opened his own shop in Fort Erie to supply goods to the military and fur traders. In 1796, he relocated to Queenston. In 1800, he was named justice of the peace in the Niagara District.

In 1803, Dickson became customs collector at Queenston. Beginning in 1804, he operated a ferry between Queenston and Lewiston, New York. In 1812, he was elected to the 6th Parliament of Upper Canada representing the 3rd riding in Lincoln. During the War of 1812, he served with the Lincoln Militia, becoming lieutenant-colonel. He was wounded at the Battle of Chippawa in 1814. He served as an associate judge at the so-called Bloody Assize held at Ancaster later that year.

He died in Queenston in 1825.

His brother William was a member of the Legislative Council for the province.
