= Battle of Buffalo =

1813 battle of the War of 1812

- Part of War of 1812
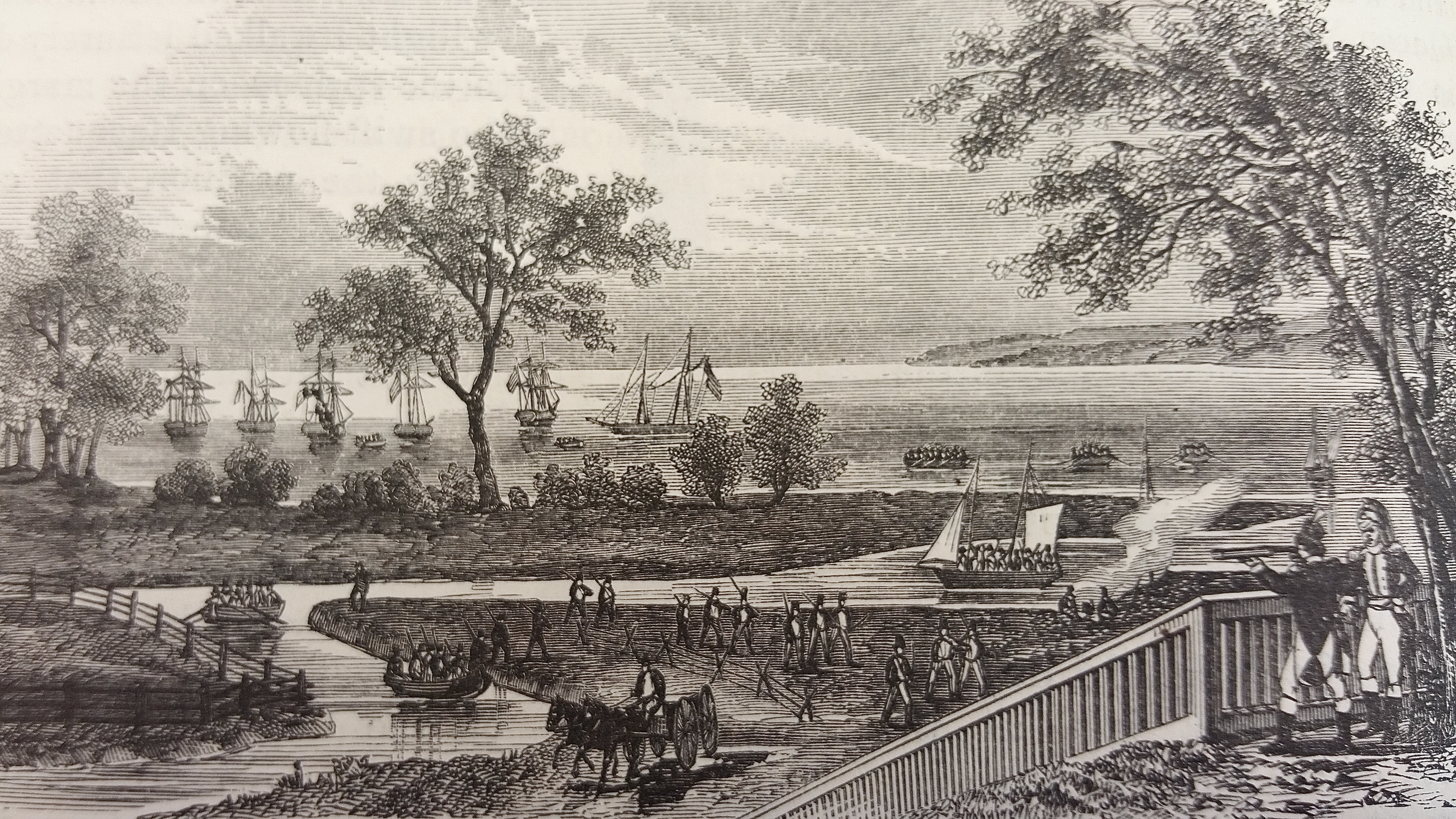
- The port of Buffalo prior to the battle in 1813
Date	December 30, 1813
Location	Buffalo, New York 42°56′11″N 78°53′52″W
Result	British-Indigenous victory

Belligerents
United Kingdom; Indigenous	United States

Commanders and leaders
(United Kingdom of Great Britain and Ireland) Gordon Drummond (United Kingdom of Great Britain and Ireland) Phineas Riall	(United States) Amos Hall

Strength
965 British regulars 400 Natives; 50 Canadian militia	2,011

Casualties and losses
31 killed 72 wounded 5 captured 4 missing	50 killed 52 wounded 11 wounded prisoners 56 captured

The Battle of Buffalo (also known as the Battle of Black Rock) took place during the War of 1812 on December 30, 1813, in the State of New York, near the Niagara River. The British forces drove off the American defenders and destroyed many buildings and ships. The operation was retaliation for American troops burning the Canadian village of Newark (present day Niagara-on-the-Lake).

== Background ==
When Brigadier General George McClure of the New York State Militia, commander of the garrison of Fort George, decided to abandon the post on December 10, 1813, he ordered the neighboring village of Newark to be destroyed. Giving the inhabitants only a few hours' notice, he turned them out into the cold winter night and burned all but one of the hundred and fifty or so buildings to the ground.

Lieutenant General Gordon Drummond, the newly appointed Lieutenant Governor of Upper Canada, was planning an offensive against the American positions on Niagara frontier. In the early hours of December 18, a force under Colonel John Murray captured Fort Niagara by surprise. Another force under Major General Phineas Riall raided the American side of the lower Niagara River, destroying the villages of Lewiston, Youngstown, Manchester, Tuscarora and the small military post and surrounding settlement of Fort Schlosser.

Riall's raid was eventually halted when the Americans set fire to a bridge over the Tonawanda Creek. Drummond and Riall intended further devastation, and Riall's troops returned to the Canadian side of the Niagara and marched south around Niagara Falls, carrying their boats, to launch an attack on the villages of Buffalo and Black Rock.

== Opposing forces ==
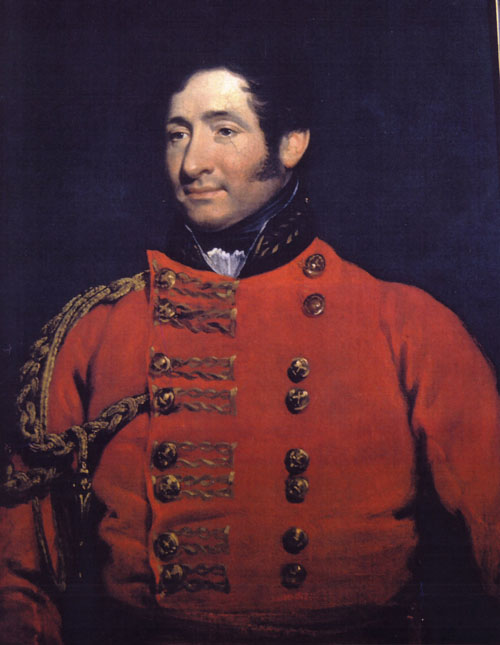
Major General Phineas Riall led a force of British regulars, Canadian militia and First Nation warriors.

Riall led a force consisting of 370 men of the 1st Regiment of Foot (Royal Scots), 240 men of the 8th (King's) Regiment, 250 men of the 41st Regiment of Foot, 55 light infantrymen of the 89th Regiment of Foot, 50 grenadiers of the 100th Regiment of Foot (Prince Regent's County of Dublin Regiment), 50 Canadian Militia and 400 British-allied Native Americans. In total, the force numbered 1,415 officers and men.

Available to the American area commander, Major General Amos Hall of the New York Militia, were 2,011 men, all of them volunteers or militia. Stationed at Buffalo were 129 cavalry under Lieutenant Colonel Seymour Boughton, 433 Ontario County volunteers under Lieutenant Colonel Blakeslee, 136 Buffalo Militia under Lieutenant Colonel Cyrenius Chapin, 97 of the Corps of Canadian Volunteers under Lieutenant Colonel Benajah Mallory, 382 of the Genesse Militia Regiment under Major Adams and 307 Chautauqua Militia under Lieutenant Colonel John McMahon. At Black Rock were 382 of Lieutenant Colonel Warren's and Lieutenant Colonel Churchill's Regiments under Brigadier General Timothy Hopkins, 37 mounted infantry under Captain Ransom, 83 Native Americans under Lieutenant Colonel Erastus Granger and 25 militia artillerymen with a six-pounder gun under Lieutenant Seeley.

== Battle ==
Riall crossed the Niagara around midnight on December 29 and landed with most of his men some 2 miles (3.2 km) downstream of Black Rock in the early hours of December 30. He delegated Lieutenant Colonel John Gordon and the Royal Scots to land at Black Rock itself in order to attack the Americans from a different direction. Major General Amos Hall was first alerted to the British presence when Riall's advance guard, the light infantry company of the 89th Regiment, drove off the American picket at Conjunckaty Creek (now known as Scajaquada Creek) and captured the bridge and the battery there. Hall sent the militia under Warren and Churchill to reconnoitre. When they ran off at the first enemy fire, Hall dispatched a second force under Adams and Chapin but exactly the same thing happened. Hall now took personal command of the remainder of his force. He ordered a detachment under Lieutenant Colonel Blakeslee to attack the British left and advanced toward Black Rock with the rest of his men.

As dawn broke, Hall directed "a very heavy fire of cannon and musketry" at Gordon's Royal Scots as they tried to land at Black Rock. Gordon was supported by the fire of a five-gun battery but several of his boats grounded and his regiment incurred substantial casualties before they could force their way ashore. Riall now advanced with his main body against Hall's center, sending a detachment from his left wing to hit the American right flank. Although the Americans fought with considerable obstinacy, according to Riall, after half an hour of fighting the American right wing broke into a rout. In order to avoid being outflanked, Hall ordered a general retreat. The British pursued all the way to Buffalo, two miles away. Once in Buffalo, the British and Indians sacked it, burning down all but four of its buildings. Riall's troops also destroyed the navy yard and three armed schooners (the Chippewa, Ariel, Little Belt) and one sloop (the Trippe).

Riall's force then moved on to Black Rock, where once again, all but one building was razed to the ground, before going back over the Niagara to Canada.

== Casualties ==
The British casualty return gave 25 British regulars, 3 militiamen and 3 Native Americans killed; 63 regulars, 6 militiamen and 3 Native Americans wounded; and 9 regulars missing: a total of 31 killed, 72 wounded and 9 missing. Of these, 13 killed, 32 wounded and 6 missing were from the Royal Scots, who had endured a heavy cannonade while grounded in their boats. The Americans took 5 prisoners.

The official American casualty figures were reported as 50 killed and 52 wounded. The dead included Lieutenant Colonel Boughton. The Ontario Messenger of January 25, 1814, published a list of 67 Americans captured on December 30, 11 of whom were wounded. Lieutenant Colonel Chapin was among the prisoners. Eight pieces of American artillery were captured. One American civilian was killed by an Indian warrior.

== Aftermath ==
On January 22, 1814, Lieutenant General Sir George Prevost, British Commander-in-Chief in North America, issued a proclamation in which he expressed his regret that "the miseries inflicted upon the inhabitants of Newark" had necessitated such retaliation.
