= Battle of the Mississinewa =

Battle during the War of 1812

- Part of the War of 1812
Date	December 17–18, 1812
Location	Jalapa, Indiana
Result	American victory

Belligerents
Miami tribe	United States

Commanders and leaders
Francis Godfroy; Joseph Richardville	John B. Campbell

Strength
300 infantry	600 cavalry

Casualties and losses
38 killed (claimed); 8 men and 34 others captured	12 killed 46 wounded

The Battle of the Mississinewa, also known as Mississineway, was an expedition ordered by William Henry Harrison against Miami Indian villages in response to the attacks on Fort Wayne and Fort Harrison in the Indiana Territory. The site is near the city of Marion, Indiana.

From 1988 to 2023, the location was the site of Mississinewa 1812, the largest War of 1812 reenactment in the United States, which is held every October. In 2004, a large memorial was unveiled and is currently on display near the Mississinewa River in downtown Marion.

== Expedition ==
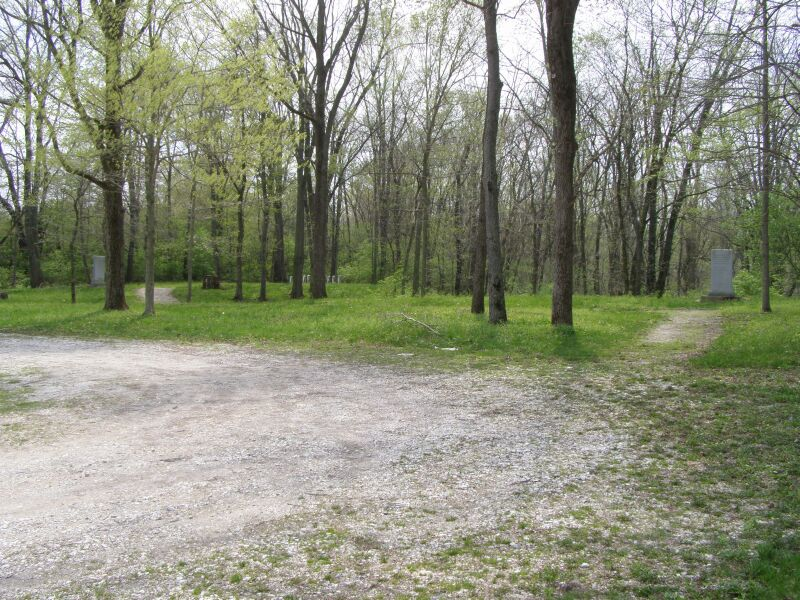
Encampment area of the American Troops, when they were attacked by the Miami Nation

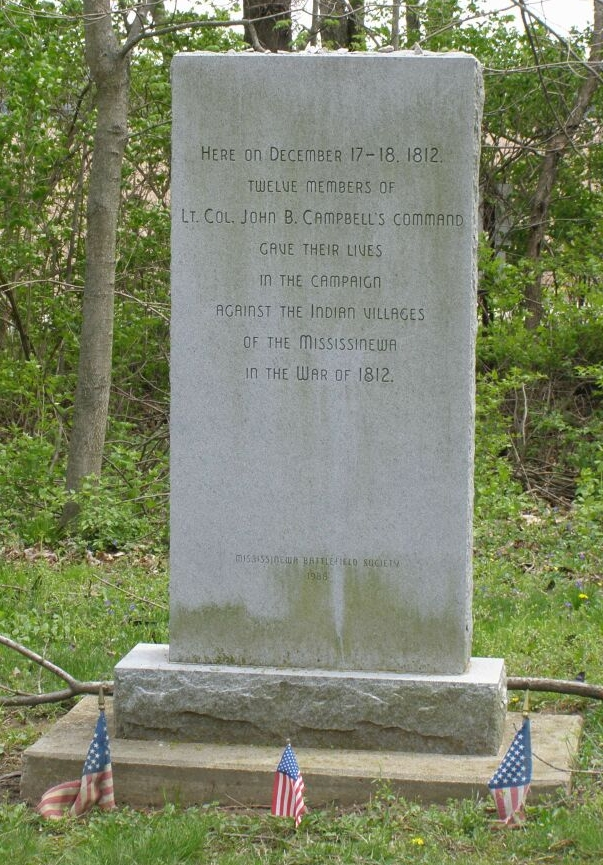
Memorial to the U.S. Soldiers who died at the Battle of Mississinewa

After receiving permission from Secretary of War William Eustis, Harrison ordered Lieutenant Colonel John B. Campbell to lead an expedition into Indiana. Campbell's objective was to destroy the Miami villages along the Mississinewa River. If possible, he was to avoid harm to Miami chiefs Pacanne, Jean Baptiste Richardville, White Loon, or Lenape Chief Silver Heel. Campbell's force of 600 mounted troops departed from Fort Greenville on December 14 and traveled 80 miles (130 km) and reached Silver Heel's village on December 17 and took 42 Lenape prisoners.

The mounted force then moved down the Mississinewa River, attacking at least two Miami villages. The Indians were taken by surprise and had not evacuated. A large number of Miami were killed, and 76 were taken prisoner, including 34 women and children. Later that day, having accomplished his objective, Campbell considered returning to Fort Greenville on account of severe frostbite among his troops.

The next morning, December 18, as Campbell returned to Silver Heel's village, a sizeable Native American force counterattacked. The American Indians were outnumbered, but fought fiercely to rescue the captured villagers being held by Campbell. A joint cavalry charge led by Major James McDowell and Captains Trotter and Johnston finally broke the attack.

The American loss was 8 killed and 48 wounded (of whom 4 later died). Campbell claimed that 8 Indians were killed on December 17 and that at least 30 were killed on December 18. 8 warriors and thirty-four women and children were captured.

One of the captured villagers told Campbell that Tecumseh was nearby and was coming with hundreds of men, so Campbell began the return march to Fort Greenville, taking with him the 42 prisoners. It was a costly victory. During the return trek, the American force was plagued greatly by frostbite, and by the time they reached Fort Greenville on December 28, some 300 of Campbell's troops were suffering from frostbite and rendered unfit for duty. An entire regiment, under Colonel Simrale, was disbanded due to frostbite.

== Aftermath ==
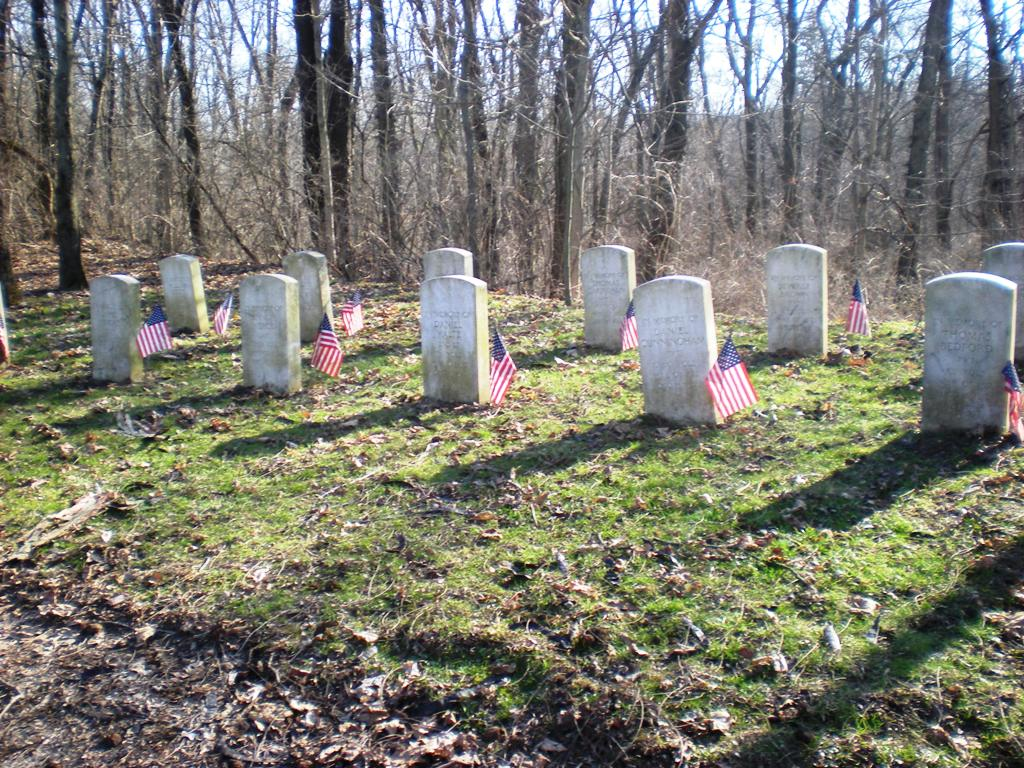
Graves of soldiers who died at the battle.

The Indian force was only concerned with protecting their lives and winter food supplies. In order to ensure this, they needed to stop Cambell's expedition and force it to return to its base, which they did. Harrison claimed the expedition as a victory because of the prisoners that were taken, and he contemplated sending another expedition down the Mississinewa despite the fact that over half his cavalry was incapacitated either from battle wounds or frostbite. Harrison received approval and appointed Campbell a full colonel in the Regular Army.

Harrison ordered another attack on the Mississinewa villages the following July. Although crops and houses were again destroyed, the Miami had evacuated and escaped further casualties.

Three active battalions of the Regular Army (1-3 Inf, 2-3 Inf and 4-3 Inf) perpetuate the lineages of the old 19th Infantry Regiment, which had elements that participated in the Battle of the Mississinewa.

== See also ==
- List of battles fought in Indiana
