= James Young (Upper Canada politician) =

Upper Canada militia officer and politician

James Young (1777 – July 1, 1831) was a farmer and political figure in Upper Canada.

He was born in Nova Scotia in 1777 and settled in Ameliasburgh Township in Upper Canada. In 1808, he was named justice of the peace in the Midland District. He served in the local militia during the War of 1812 and became lieutenant colonel in 1824. He represented Hastings & Ameliasburg in the 6th Parliament of Upper Canada. He died at Carrying Place in 1831.
