= Abraham Markle =

Abraham Markle (October 26, 1770 – March 6, 1826) was a businessman and political figure in Upper Canada and co-proprietor of Terre Haute, Indiana. During the War of 1812 he defected to the United States.

== Early life ==
He was born in Ulster County, New York in 1770. Four of his brothers served with Butler's Rangers during the American Revolution; they settled at Newark (Niagara-on-the-Lake) after the war and he joined them for a time, but he later moved back to New York state. In 1806, he established a distillery at Ancaster in Upper Canada. In 1812, he was elected to the 6th Parliament of Upper Canada representing West York. In 1811, he had refused to serve with the Lincoln Militia.

== War of 1812 ==
In 1813, with Joseph Willcocks, he opposed the suspension of habeas corpus in the province. In June of that year, he was imprisoned because he had been accused of treason. He was released and by December had joined the American side in the War of 1812. He was involved in a number of raids against settlements in Upper Canada.

=== Raid on Port Dover ===
Markle accompanied the American Raid on Port Dover, in which the village was burned down. Markle witnessed the destruction of the property of Robert Nichol, who had moved for Markle's expulsion from the Legislature.

== Later life ==
After the war, he settled in Vigo County, Indiana and was one of the original proprietors of the Terre Haute Company which platted the village of Terre Haute. He built and operated a mill on Otter Creek north of that village and became involved in other businesses in the area.

He died in 1826 while working on his farm there, apparently due to a stroke.
