= Capture of Fort Niagara =

1813 battle in the War of 1812

- Part of War of 1812
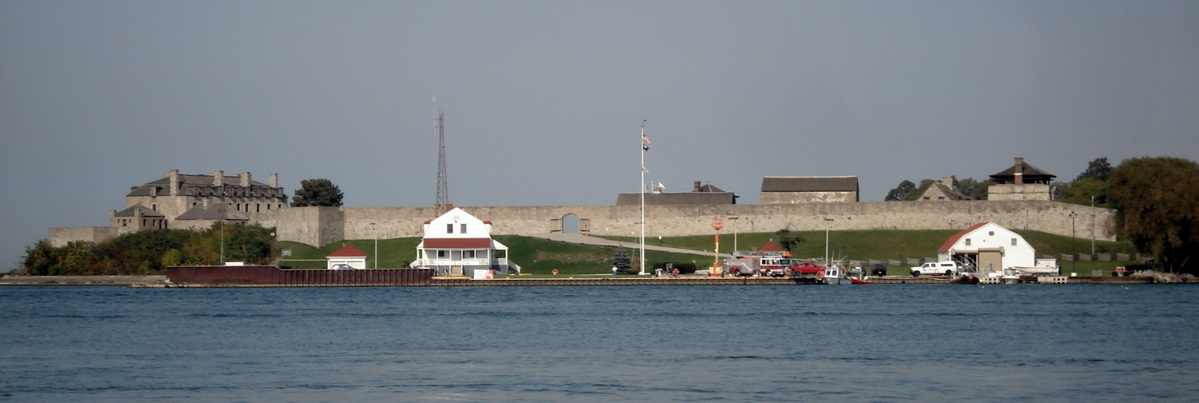
- View of Fort Niagara from the Ontario side of the Niagara River
Date	December 19, 1813
Location	Fort Niagara, Niagara River, near Youngstown, New York 43.26286°N 79.06153°W
Result	British victory

Belligerents
United Kingdom	United States

Commanders and leaders
Gordon Drummond; John Murray	Nathaniel Leonard

Strength
500 British regulars 50 Canadian militia 12 First Nations militia	324 regulars unknown number militia

Casualties and losses
6 killed 5 wounded	65–80 killed 14 wounded prisoners 344 captured

The Capture of Fort Niagara took place 19 December 1813 during the War of 1812 between Great Britain and the United States. The American garrison was taken by surprise, and the fort was captured in a night assault by a select force of British regular infantry.

== Background ==
Fort Niagara was an important American post near the outlet of the Niagara River on Lake Ontario. During the early days of the war, it was involved in several exchanges of artillery fire against the British at Fort George on the other side of the river.

On 27 May 1813, the Americans won the Battle of Fort George. This left Fort George in their hands, and they briefly captured the entire Niagara peninsula, but they were then driven back to a narrow enclave around Fort George. Later during the year, almost all the regular soldiers on the Niagara front were redeployed to Sacket's Harbor to take part in an attack down the Saint Lawrence River against Montreal. They had briefly been replaced by regulars from the western theatre under William Henry Harrison, but in November these too had been ordered to march to protect Sacket's Harbor, which had been stripped of troops to furnish the Montreal expedition. This left Brigadier General George McClure of the New York militia with only 60 regulars, 40 volunteers from the New York militia and 100 Canadian Volunteers (renegades fighting for the United States) to hold Fort George.

=== Burning of Niagara ===
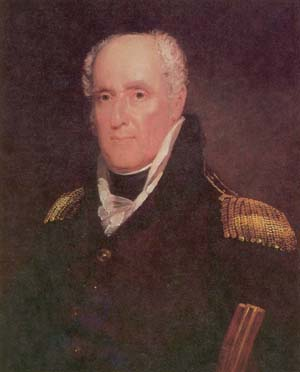
Earlier in the year, United States Secretary of War, John Armstrong, permitted the destruction of the nearby village Niagara, Upper Canada

In late 1813, Major General Francis de Rottenburg, the British Lieutenant Governor of Upper Canada, had been alarmed by defeats in the west (the Battle of Lake Erie and the Battle of the Thames) and American concentrations to the east. On 9 October he ordered the troops on the Niagara peninsula to retreat hastily to Burlington Heights at the western end of Lake Ontario. He intended to abandon even this position and concentrate his forces at Kingston but during the first week in December, de Rottenburg was replaced by the more forceful Lieutenant General Gordon Drummond. Drummond was aware that the American attack on Montreal had been defeated, leaving the American army stranded in poorly-supplied winter quarters in Upper New York State. He immediately cancelled de Rottenburg's plans for further retreat, and ordered the units at Burlington Heights to advance instead.

On 10 December, McClure learned of this advance. He had despaired of receiving any reinforcements and decided his position was untenable. He hastily evacuated his troops to Fort Niagara. The artillery could not be withdrawn from Fort George and was thrown into the ditch surrounding the fort.

Earlier in the year, the United States Secretary of War, John Armstrong, had given permission to destroy the nearby village of Niagara (also known as Newark) if it became necessary to prevent British troops finding cover close to Fort George. The inhabitants were to be given several days' notice, and care was to be taken that they were not to be left destitute. As the Americans abandoned Fort George, McClure gave the order to burn down the village with only two hours warning, leaving the inhabitants without shelter or possessions in the depths of winter. Part of the village of Queenston was also torched. It was alleged that the pro-American Canadian Volunteers performed most of the destruction.

This action was undoubtedly contrary to the conventions which governed warfare at the time, although several similar acts had already been committed by both sides during the war.

== Battle ==
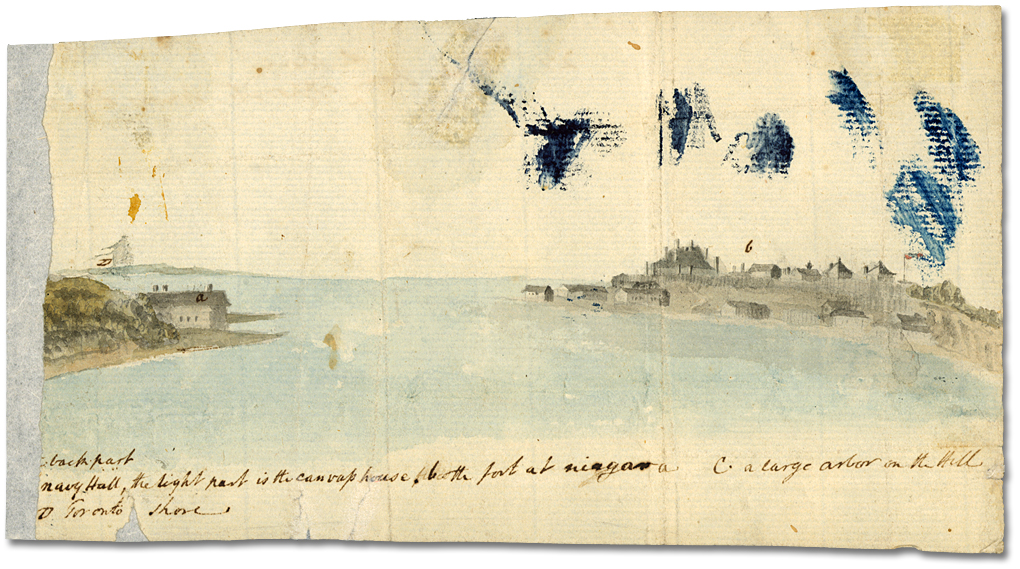
Fort Niagara (right) in 1793. The Fort was an important American outpost near the outlet of the Niagara River into Lake Ontario.

Once the British had recovered Fort George, Fort Niagara was vulnerable to a British attack. Its defenders consisted of Captain Nathaniel Leonard's company of the 1st U.S. Artillery, Captain Frank Hampton's company of the 24th U.S. Infantry, and small detachments (mainly convalescents, wounded or sick men) from other regular units. Captain Leonard was in command of the fort. He had been attracting unfavourable reports from his superiors since taking charge of the fort in 1812 and was a notorious drunkard, but orders to replace him as commandant had not been carried out. The defences of Fort Niagara had been allowed to deteriorate and damage to the outer defences caused by artillery fire in 1812 and early 1813 had not been repaired, although this was not to be a factor in the fort's capture.

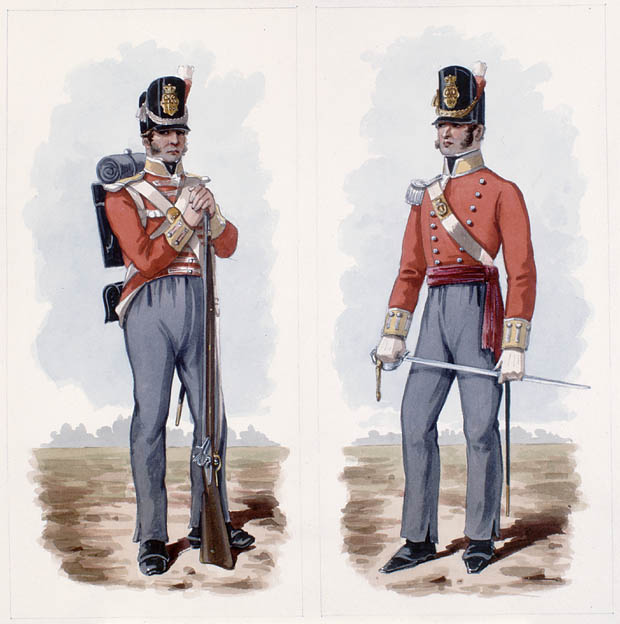
Private and officer of the 100th Regiment of the Foot, c. 1814. On the night of December 18, the regiment, along with several other British units, crossed the Niagara River.

Drummond had ordered boats to be brought forward from Burlington. They proceeded by water to the mouth of the Four Mile Creek, from where Canadian militia carried them overland on sledges to Fort George. On the night of 18 December, a force consisting of the 100th Foot, the grenadier company of the 1st Battalion of the Royal Scots, and the grenadier and light infantry companies of the 41st Foot, with some small detachments of militia and Holcroft's Company, 4th Battalion Royal Artillery crossed the river 3 miles (4.8 km) above Fort Niagara. The force numbered 562 and was under the command of Colonel John Murray, the commanding officer of the 100th Foot. They were equipped with axes and scaling ladders and under orders to use the bayonet so as not to lose the advantage of surprise.

They captured American pickets posted in the village of Youngstown, the men having been trying to stay warm instead of keeping watch. One of the prisoners was forced to reveal the American challenge and password. The British force then advanced silently towards the fort. An advance party of some artillerymen and the grenadier company of the 100th under a lieutenant and a sergeant approached the gate, where the sergeant affected an accent from the southern American states and confused the guard long enough to gain entry. By the time the defenders became aware of the deception, it was too late to stop the British from rushing in.

Resistance came mainly from two buildings, the South Redoubt and the Red Barracks, which was being used as a hospital. Some of the defenders barricaded themselves inside the South Redoubt of the fort and held off repeated attempts to break into the building. However, when they refused demands that they surrender, the British commander offered no quarter to the defenders. When the attackers forced their way into the building, the order was given to "Bayonet the whole".

== Casualties ==
Only six of the attackers were killed, with five wounded.

The British report on the engagement listed 65 Americans killed, 14 wounded prisoners and 344 other prisoners. However, Robert Lee, an American civilian who had been visiting the Fort when it was attacked, gave a sworn deposition on 18 January 1814 that the British report giving 65 Americans killed had been "issued very soon after they took possession of the fort and did not include a number that were afterwards found bayoneted in the cellars of the houses". Lee thought that "at least eighty" Americans had in fact been killed. Captain Leonard was captured at his home two miles away, allegedly drunk.

== Aftermath ==
Fort's flag

A force consisting of the centre companies of the Royal Scots and the 41st under Major General Phineas Riall followed Murray's troops across the river. At the Battle of Lewiston, they captured several outposts and batteries, and proceeded to burn down almost every village on the American side of the river, including Lewiston and a nearby settlement of Tuscarora Indians, in reprisal for the burning of Newark. Some Indians accompanied Riall; one source stated that up to 500 "Western Indians", who had remained with the British after the Battle of the Thames the previous autumn, took part. Many of the Indians (and some British soldiers) became drunk on looted liquor and several American settlers were scalped by the Indians. Riall was eventually prevented from advancing further south by some militia and Canadian Volunteers who destroyed the bridge over the Tonawanda Creek.

Having returned to the Canadian side of the Niagara, Riall marched upstream past Niagara Falls, carrying the boats. On 30 December, Riall crossed the Niagara again, 2 miles (3.2 km) downstream of Black Rock and defeated American forces at the Battle of Buffalo, after which the villages of Black Rock and Buffalo were set ablaze and the navy yard on Buffalo Creek was destroyed.

Fort Niagara remained in British possession until the end of the war.

=== Battle Honours ===
In the tradition of British Army battle honours, this action was first awarded in 1815 as Niagara. Units present at the capture that hold this title include:

- Captain Holcroft's company of the Royal Artillery, now known as 52 (Niagara) Battery Royal Artillery - (fought at the capture of Fort Niagara and the Battle of Lundy's Lane)
- 100th Regiment of Foot (Prince Regent's County of Dublin Regiment) - Honour regranted in 1875 to successor regiment, the 100th (Prince of Wales's Royal Canadian) Regiment of Foot

Eight currently active battalions of the American Army (1-3 Inf, 2-3 Inf, 4-3 Inf, 1-4 Inf, 2-4 Inf, 3-4 Inf, 2-7 Inf and 3-7 Inf) perpetuate the lineages of three American infantry units (the old 14th, 19th and 24th Infantry Regiments) that were present at Fort Niagara.
