= Mississinewa 1812 =

Mississinewa 1812 claims to be the largest War of 1812 reenactment in the United States. It attracts reenactors from all over the US and Canada. It is currently located on private property outside of Gas City, Indiana, and occurs every October.

== History ==
From 1988 to 2023 (except 2020), the event was held on federally owned land near Marion, Indiana. The 2020 event was cancelled due to the COVID-19 outbreak. Due to a land dispute, the 2024 event was cancelled, and in 2025 the event moved to a newly purchased property on the outskirts of Gas City.

=== Land dispute ===
In 2024, the Federally recognized tribe of Miami in Oklahoma made demands of the organizers that:

1. There be no native American presence on the battlefield and
2. There be no native American impressions permitted unless they were a card-carrying member of a native tribe.

The organizers of Mississinewa 1812 held the position that such demands were untenable, and cancelled the 2024 event, in search for a new location.

=== Ahsenionki ===
In August 2024, the organizers announced that they had purchased a disused gravel pit near Gas City, which they named Ahsenionki, and would be hosting the event there.

== Dates ==
- October 2-4, 2026
- October 1-3, 2027
