= Gordon Drummond =

British Army officer and colonial administrator (1772–1854)

General Sir Gordon Drummond GCB
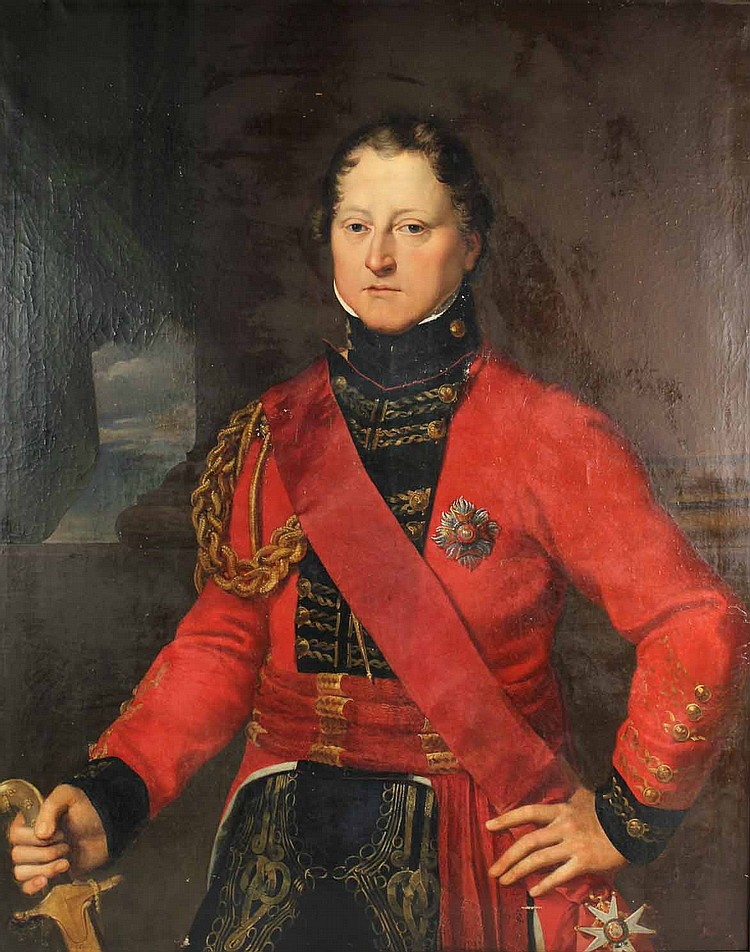
- Portrait by Filippo Agricola, c. 1817–1820

Governor General of the Canadas
- In office 1815–1816
- Monarch: George III
- Preceded by: George Prevost
- Succeeded by: John Coape Sherbrooke

Lieutenant Governor of Upper Canada
- Acting
- In office 1813–1814
- Monarch: George III
- Governor General: George Prevost
- Preceded by: Francis de Rottenburg
- Succeeded by: Sir George Murray

Personal details
- Born: 27 September 1772 Quebec City, Quebec
- Died: 10 October 1854 (aged 82) London, England
- Spouse: Margaret Russell (m. 1807)
- Children: two sons, one daughter
- Parent(s): Colin Drummond; Catherine Oliphant
- Namesake(s): Drummondville, Quebec; Drummond Island, Michigan

Military service
- Allegiance: United Kingdom of Great Britain and Ireland
- Branch/service: British Army
- Rank: General
- Commands: The Canadas
- Battles/wars: French Revolutionary Wars; Flanders Campaign; Egyptian Campaign; War of 1812; Capture of Fort Niagara; Battle of Buffalo; Battle of Lundy's Lane; Siege of Fort Erie

General Sir Gordon Drummond, GCB (27 September 1772 – 10 October 1854) was a British Army officer and colonial administrator in British North America, mainly during the War of 1812. As Lieutenant Governor of Upper Canada, Drummond distinguished himself on the Niagara front in the War of 1812. He later became the administrator of the British North American colonies.

== Early years ==
Arms of Sir Gordon Drummond: Parted per fess wavy or and gules, in chief a martlet sable.

Gordon Drummond was born in Quebec City on 27 September 1772. He was of Scottish descent, the son of Colin Drummond (1722–1776), of Megginch Castle, Perthshire, and his wife Catherine Oliphant of Rossie. His sister, Elizabeth married Lord Hervey, one brother, John Drummond married a daughter of John Fane, 9th Earl of Westmorland and another brother, Vice-Admiral Sir Adam Drummond, KCH, married Lady Charlotte Murray, eldest daughter of John Murray, 4th Duke of Atholl.

Gordon's father first came to Lower Canada in 1764 as the Quebec agent to the London firm of Sir Samuel Fludyer, Adam Drummond (his brother) & Franks, contractors for victualling the troops in North America. At Quebec, Colin Drummond became a business partner of Jacob Jordan and served as Commissary General, deputy Paymaster General to the Forces in the Province of Quebec and Legislative Councillor. Gordon was three years old when Quebec City was unsuccessfully sieged by American forces in 1775. Four years after Colin Drummond's death, in 1780 the family left Quebec and Gordon received his education at Westminster School in England before entering the British Army as an ensign with the 1st Foot in 1789.

In 1794, he served as a junior lieutenant-colonel in the Netherlands, commanded by the Duke of York. At the siege of Nijmegen Drummond was commended in the successful repelling of a French sortie. In 1801 Drummond led the 8th Regiment of Foot ashore at the Battle of Abukir and fought in a number of engagements in Egypt including the Battle of Alexandria and the Capture of Cairo. He also saw service in the Mediterranean and the West Indies. In 1805, at the age of 33 years, Drummond had attained the rank of major general.

== War of 1812 ==
Drummond first came back to Canada in 1809 on the staff of Governor General Sir James Henry Craig. After briefly serving as Commander-in-Chief of the Canadas in 1811, as a result of Craig being recalled to England, Drummond was reassigned to Ulster. Late in 1813, Drummond was recalled to North America to serve in Upper Canada as lieutenant governor, replacing Francis de Rottenburg. Rottenburg had proven an unpopular officer who was considered over-cautious, nervous about any sort of engagement, and reluctant to send reinforcements to vital areas. Successive lieutenant governors—Rottenburg and his predecessor, Roger Hale Sheaffe—had failed to make an impact in the North American war since the death of the successful Sir Isaac Brock at the Battle of Queenston Heights.

Drummond soon proved himself in Brock's mould: aggressive and willing to take chances, and in December Drummond launched a surprise attack which led to the capture of Fort Niagara. After the American burning of Newark Drummond crossed the Niagara River, fought the Battle of Black Rock and burned Buffalo in retaliation. The involvement of Canadian defectors in the destruction of Newark outraged the population of Upper Canada. Acting Attorney-General John Beverley Robinson convinced Drummond, in his role of Lieutenant Governor, to put forward legislation to make it easier to prosecute treason.

In May 1814, fifteen prisoners were convicted of high treason and sentenced to death by a special court convened by Robinson and presided over by Chief Justice Thomas Scott. Drummond, as acting Lieutenant Governor, was pressured by Robinson to allow the sentences to be carried out. Eight were hanged at Burlington Heights on 20 July 1814 while the rest had their sentences reduced to exile. At the time of the executions, Drummond was on route from Kingston to Niagara to take over field command of the army.

Drummond, like Brock and Henry Procter, was continually hungry for reinforcements from the governor general, Sir George Prevost, who held relatively large numbers of troops in reserve at Quebec, despite the fact that no enemy had even come close to endangering the capital. Despite a constant lack of manpower and war material, Drummond had all but driven the American forces from the Niagara by the close of the 1813–1814 winter campaign. In July 1814, responding to a request from the beleaguered Major-General Phineas Riall, Drummond went with his troops from York to Fort George to take command from Riall and drive back Jacob Brown's invading soldiers. On 25 July, he ordered an immediate attack on the American forces, which were already engaging Riall's troops near Chippawa. In this way, a small skirmish exploded into the bloody and inconclusive Battle of Lundy's Lane, which cost each side over 850 casualties and left the British in possession of the road, although it is uncertain whether the British drove the Americans from the field, or the Americans drove off the British and were simply forced to withdraw by a lack of supplies. The latter is likely the case, based upon evidence compiled by Donald Graves, a Canadian historian employed at the Directorate of History, Department of National Defence Canada.

At Lundy's Lane, Drummond suffered a serious wound from a shot to the neck during the battle and Riall was captured by American forces. Nonetheless, Drummond insisted that Lundy's Lane was a total victory, and tried to smash Brown's army into the ground by chasing them to Fort Erie. An attempt to storm the fort on 14 August was a failure, partially due to the unfortunate explosion of the fort's magazine that wiped out an entire arm of his attack force. The casualties from the one attack numbered over 900, greater than one-third of his army. Drummond's cousin, Lieutenant Colonel William Drummond, was killed during the attack.

Drummond was forced by the capture of Riall and injury or illness of several of his other senior officers to superintend every detail of the operations against Fort Erie, in addition to his other duties as Lieutenant Governor. In September, when shortage of supplies and exposure to bad weather made it already inevitable that the siege would fail, Drummond was taken by surprise by an American sortie from the fortress, which destroyed two out of the three siege batteries and inflicted heavy casualties. As a result, Drummond was forced to abandon the siege of Fort Erie and withdraw to Chippawa.

He regained some face from his defeat when in November that same year the Americans, suffering severe food shortages, withdrew from Fort Erie and allowed what remained of Drummond's army to secure the frontier. However, the summer of 1814 was Drummond's last major military campaign. The arrival of the Duke of Wellington's veterans after the first defeat of French Emperor Napoleon Bonaparte allowed the British to launch an offensive into the United States during the summer and autumn months of 1814, but it was Prevost, de Rottenburg, and some of Wellington's officers that led that attack as Wellington remained behind in England.

== Postwar and return to England ==
In early 1815, following the ending of all hostilities, Drummond remained in Upper Canada as Lieutenant-Governor, and when Prevost was recalled to Britain, he took over as Governor-General and Administrator of Canada in Quebec City. At the opening of the session of the legislature, the House of Assembly of Lower Canada (Quebec) welcomed him as a son of the province and war hero. Drummond responded to the members of the house that it was his honour to fight "in the defence of this my native country". Aside from helping establish the peace laid down by the Treaty of Ghent, his post-war career in Canada as a civil administrator focused on military settlements and Indigenous affairs. Drummond fought to secure a pension for Mohawk Chief Teyoninhokarawen (John Norton) whom he described as "of the coolest and most undaunted courage."

As Commander of the Forces, Drummond restricted the use of the punishment of flogging in the army and offered a general amnesty to deserters. To show his respect for the troops that served under him, Drummond successfully secured the battle honour of NIAGARA for British and Canadian regular regiments that fought at Fort Niagara, Lundy's Lane and Fort Erie. For the widows and orphans of soldiers, Drummond donated all his prize money from the war.

Shortly after his return to England, Drummond on 1 July 1816 was raised to Knight Commander of the Grand Cross of the Order of the Bath, the first Canadian to receive this honour. The investment ceremony was conducted by both the Prince Regent and Prince Frederick, Duke of York and Albany, Commander-in-Chief of the British Army. In 1825, Drummond was promoted to full general, and twenty years later became the most senior general in the British Army. Despite his knighthood and promotion as well as his continuing active duty status, he never saw action in battle again.

He was appointed colonel of the 88th Regiment of Foot (Connaught Rangers) on 3 November 1819, transferring to the 71st Regiment of Foot on 16 January 1824. On 21 September 1829 he transferred again to the 49th Regiment of Foot and on 24 April 1846 to the 8th (The Kings) Regiment of Foot, serving in that capacity to his death.

Sir Gordon Drummond died on 10 October 1854 at his home in London at age 82.

== Legacy ==
Places named in honour of Sir Gordon Drummond include the following:

- Drummondville, Quebec
- Drummond Regional County Municipality, Quebec
- Drummond Island, Michigan
- Drummond Township, Michigan.
- Drummond Township, Lanark County, Ontario
- Drummond Street, Downtown Toronto, Ontario
- Drummond Road, Niagara Falls, Ontario
- Drummondville, Ontario - a former village, incorporated in 1831 near the site of the Battle of Lundy's Lane, and now a part of Niagara Falls, Ontario

The town of Perth, Ontario, was named after Drummond's ancestral home of Perth, Scotland, in his honour and also has a Drummond Street.

Drummond Street, Montreal, Quebec, is named after Jane Drummond (no relation), the second wife of John Redpath, not after Gordon Drummond, as is sometimes thought.

- Fort Drumond a Battery and Redoubt built by Drummond and named for him in Queenston Ontario

== Family ==
In 1807, Drummond married Margaret Russell, daughter of William Russell (1734–1817) of Brancepeth Castle. They had two sons and a daughter:

- Gordon Drummond, colonel of the Coldstream Guards. He served at the Siege of Sevastopol (1854–1855), and died at Durham on 17 November 1856.
- William Russell Drummond R.N. (died 1835). His death occurred at Callao, Peru, while he was serving on HMS Satellite. It was connected with a mutiny there. A somewhat muddled account is in the memoirs of Crawford Pasco, who writes that the mutineers were supporters of the exiled Chilean Ramón Freire. In fact they declared in favour of Antonio Gutiérrez de la Fuente, just arrived in the port, against Luis José de Orbegoso.
- Eliza, married Henry Howard, 2nd Earl of Effingham.

Government offices
Preceded by Francis de Rottenburg	Lieutenant Governor of Upper Canada; 1813–1814	Succeeded by Francis Gore
Military offices
Preceded by ?	Colonel of the 97th (Queen's Own Germans) Regiment of Foot); 1814–?1818	Succeeded by Disbanded 1818
Preceded by Sir William Beresford, 1st Viscount Beresford	Colonel of the 88th Regiment of Foot (Connaught Rangers); 1819–1824	Succeeded by Sir Henry Frederick Campbell
Preceded by Francis Dundas	Colonel of the 71st (Highland) Regiment of Foot; 1824–1829	Succeeded by Sir Colin Halkett
Preceded by Sir Miles Nightingall	Colonel of the 49th Regiment of Foot; 1829–1846	Succeeded by Sir Edward Bowater
Preceded by Sir Henry Bayly	Colonel of the 8th (The King's) Regiment of Foot; 1846–1854	Succeeded by John Duffy
