= Battle of Lewiston =

1813 battle in the War of 1812

Coordinates: 43°10′23″N 79°02′40″W

- Part of War of 1812
Date	December 19, 1813
Location	Lewiston, New York
Result	British-Native victory

Belligerents
UKGBI; First Nations	United States

Commanders and leaders
Phineas Riall	Major Bennett

Strength
500	100

Casualties and losses
3 killed 2 wounded	17 killed
- 4 American civilians killed

The Battle of Lewiston saw Major General Phineas Riall lead a combined British and Native force against the American town of Lewiston in New York. They defeated the Americans in the area and then looted and burnt the town.

== Background ==
On December 10, 1813, American Brigadier General George McClure abandoned Fort George, Ontario because of a British force under General Gordon Drummond advancing toward him. Before leaving the Americans burned the town of Newark. Drummond's men then crossed the Niagara River in the Capture of Fort Niagara. Major General Phineas Riall launched an attack on the nearby town of Lewiston in conjunction.

== Battle ==
On the night of December 19, 1813, a force of 500 men consisting of Native American warriors, the main body of the 1st Battalion of the 1st Regiment of Foot and the 41st Regiment of Foot, commanded by Major-General Phineas Riall, crossed the Niagara river to attack the Americans at Lewiston. In the town of Lewiston was an American gun battery threatening Queenston. The American garrison at Lewiston had only 100 men and most of them retreated south toward Fort Schlosser. The retreat was too hasty to save the cannon at the battery and so they had to leave a 12 pounder and a 6 pounder cannon to the British. A small American contingent under an American officer named Major Bennett was trapped by the natives on the Lewiston Heights. The trapped Americans made a breakout when they charged down from the heights and away from the natives. In the escape, the Americans lost 8 killed. Riall's men pursued the Americans south. At Fort Schlosser, Canadians fighting for America led by Colonel Joseph Willcocks moved north to meet Riall's force. The Canadians fought a rearguard action skirmishing with the British for 2 days until they escaped across the Tonawanda Creek. The Canadians suffered 9 killed in the fighting.

== Aftermath ==
The natives at Lewiston found and looted liqueur from the civilians' homes. The natives drank heavily and became a violent crowd. The natives began fighting each other as well as the civilians of Lewiston. Four civilians were killed by the natives including a young boy. They even turned on each other. In a fight two natives were killed and a British soldier of the 41st regiment. Two more British soldiers were wounded by natives, one shot in the leg and another was tomahawked in the arm. The houses were looted and then every one burned to the ground. After Willcocks was driven back the British and natives burned every house and settlement on the American side of the Niagara River until they reached Fort Schlosser.

== Sources ==
- Cruikshank, Earnst (1902). The Documentary History of the Campaign Upon the Niagara Frontier in the Year 1813. Welland Ontario: Lundys Lane Historical Society.
- Hannings, Bud (2012). The War of 1812: A Complete Chronology with biographies of 63 General Officers. McFarland and Company Inc. ISBN 9780786463855.
