= Robert Nichol (Canadian politician) =

Canadian politician

Robert Nichol (ca 1780 – May 3, 1824) was a businessman, judge and political figure in Upper Canada.

Born in Scotland around 1780, he arrived in Montreal in 1792 after becoming a seaman at an early age and headed west to the Niagara Peninsula. He found work on one of Robert Hamilton's ships, worked for several years as clerk for John Askin at Detroit and, in 1800, entered business transporting goods in partnership with Thomas Clark. In 1802, Clark returned to Scotland, leaving Nichol to run the business; this caused him financial hardship. In 1806, he was appointed justice of the peace in the Niagara District. In 1808, he took over the operation of several mills, a distillery and other businesses in Woodhouse Township; he also secured contracts supplying the British garrisons in the region. In 1811, he was accused by Joseph Willcocks in the Legislative Assembly of having mishandled public funds as a road commissioner; Isaac Brock, administrator of the province, felt that this accusation was retaliation for Nichol's actions in support of the administration. He was jailed but later released and filed suit for damages against the speaker of the house, Samuel Street.

In 1812, he became lieutenant-colonel in the Norfolk militia. In the same year, he was elected to the Legislative Assembly for Norfolk and he was appointed quartermaster general of militia. Besides transporting and supplying food and clothing to the troops, Nichol is also believed to have provided useful advice in coordinating troop movements during the War of 1812. His home and businesses suffered extensive damage during the war. Compensation for these losses was only approved after his death.

During the later sessions of 6th Parliament of Upper Canada, Nichol acted as government house leader. He was re-elected in 1816; during the next parliament, he introduced a motion demanding increased power for the legislature and later introduced resolutions against the clergy reserves and restricting immigration from the United States, having shifted his position from government supporter to opposition. He also opposed the Sedition Act of 1804 that had been used to banish Robert Gourlay. He was re-elected in 1820; he helped establish a commission to improve transportation within the province and supported a proposal by Britain to united Upper and Lower Canada.

In 1824, he was appointed surrogate judge for the Niagara District. Later that year, he died at Queenston Heights while on court business when his horse and carriage went over a cliff.
