= Battle of Chippawa =

1814 battle of the War of 1812

- Part of the War of 1812
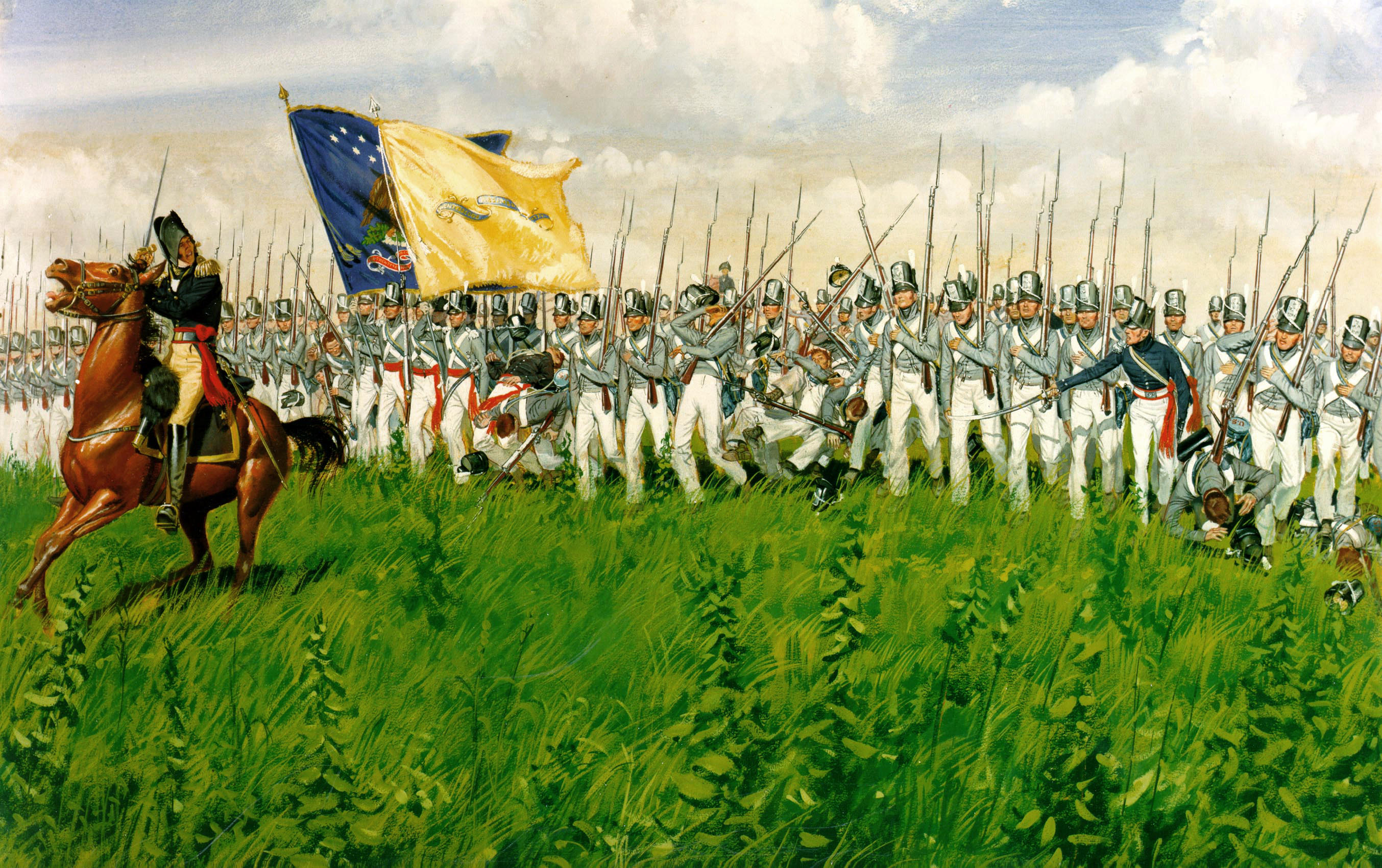
- The Battle of Chippawa; H. Charles McBarron Jr.
Date	July 5, 1814
Location	Chippawa, Upper Canada (present-day Ontario) 43°03′08″N 79°01′29″W
Result	American victory

Belligerents
United Kingdom; Upper Canada; Mohawk	United States; Seneca

Commanders and leaders
Phineas Riall	Jacob Brown; Winfield Scott; Peter Porter; Red Jacket

Strength
2,000	3,564

Casualties and losses
108 dead; 319 wounded; 100 captured; 18 missing Total: 535	60 killed; 249 wounded; 19 missing Total: 328

National Historic Site of Canada
- Official name: Battle of Chippawa National Historic Site of Canada
- Designated: 1921
- Location within Ontario Battle of Chippawa (North America)

The Battle of Chippawa (sometimes spelled Chippewa) was a War of 1812 battle fought on July 5, 1814, in which the United States Army defeated British forces during the American invasion of Upper Canada along the Niagara River. This battle and the subsequent Battle of Lundy's Lane demonstrated that trained American troops could hold their own against British regulars. The battlefield is preserved as a National Historic Site of Canada.

== Background ==
Early in 1814, it was clear that Napoleon was defeated in Europe, and seasoned British veteran soldiers from the Peninsular War would be redeployed to Canada. The United States Secretary of War, John Armstrong Jr., was eager to win a victory in Canada before British reinforcements arrived there.

Major General Jacob Brown was ordered to form the Left Division of the Army of the North. Armstrong intended him to mount an attack on Kingston, the main British base on Lake Ontario, with a diversion by militia across the Niagara River to distract the British. He had drawn up alternative orders for a major attack across the Niagara, possibly as a contingency plan, but probably to mislead the British through deliberate leaks. Brown thought that he was being presented with two possible plans, and was free to choose between them. Although Brigadier General Edmund P. Gaines tried to persuade Brown to make the attack on Kingston, Brown was unable to gain cooperation from Commodore Isaac Chauncey (commanding the American naval squadron based at Sackets Harbor, New York), which he considered essential for such an attack across Lake Ontario. Chauncey was waiting for new warships to be completed in the shipyard at Sackets Harbor and refused to make any move before the middle of July. Brown made the attack across the Niagara the main focus of his forces.

=== Scott's Camp of Instruction ===
Armstrong had also directed that two "Camps of Instruction" be set up, to improve the standards of the regular units of the United States Army. One was at Plattsburgh, New York, under Brigadier General George Izard. The other was at Buffalo, New York, near the head of the Niagara River, under Brigadier General Winfield Scott.

At Buffalo, Scott instituted a major training program. He drilled his troops for ten hours every day, using the 1791 Manual of the French Revolutionary Army. (Prior to this, various American regiments had been using a variety of different manuals, making it difficult to manoeuvre any large American force). Scott also purged his units of any remaining inefficient officers who had gained their appointments through political influence rather than experience or merit, and he insisted on proper camp discipline including sanitary arrangements. This reduced the wastage from dysentery and other enteric diseases which had been heavy in previous campaigns.

There was only one major deficiency; Scott had been unable to obtain enough regulation blue uniforms for his men. Although they had been manufactured and sent to the northern theater, they had been diverted to Plattsburgh and Sackets Harbor. The United States Army's commissary general, Callender Irvine, hastily ordered 2,000 uniforms to be made and despatched to Buffalo for Scott's other units, but because there was insufficient blue cloth, short jackets (roundabouts) of gray cloth were used instead. When Scott received the gray roundabouts, he gathered up the blue coatees belonging to his brigade and gave them to the 21st US Infantry (one of the units in Brigadier General Eleazer Wheelock Ripley's brigade), because "the black coatees of the 21st are a disgrace to the uniform and soldier of the army of the United States" (G.O. 16, Winfield Scott, May 24, 1814).

=== Niagara campaign ===
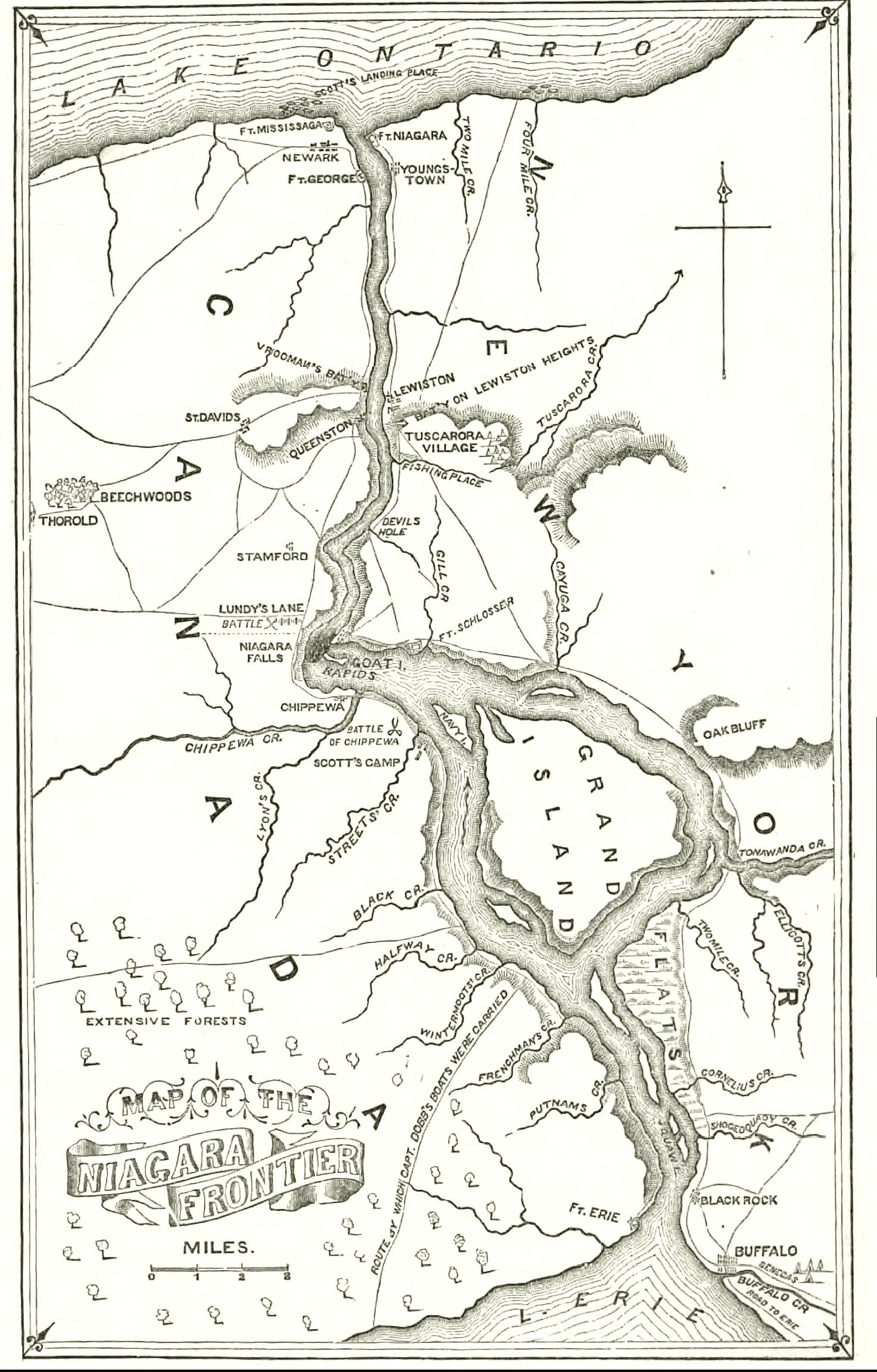
Map of the Niagara Frontier in 1814 depicting locations of the Battle of Chippawa and Lundy's Lane. Following Lundy's Lane, American forces fell back to Fort Erie, losing the initiative on the Niagara Peninsula.

By early July, Brown's division was massed at the Niagara, in accordance with Armstrong's alternate orders. Without cooperation from Chauncey, a direct attack on Fort George at the mouth of the Niagara was impossible. Nor was it possible to land large numbers of troops on the southern side of the Niagara Peninsula and advance on Burlington to cut off the British on the Niagara River, because the American squadron on Lake Erie (and the regular troops at Detroit) had been diverted to attempt the recapture of Fort Mackinac on Lake Huron. Armstrong suggested that Brown should therefore capture and hold Fort Erie, opposite Buffalo, while waiting for Chauncey to ready his squadron. Brown assented, but was prepared to push much further than the immediate vicinity of Fort Erie.

On July 3, Brown's army, consisting of the regular brigades commanded by Scott (with 1,377 men) and Ripley (with 1,082 men), and four companies of artillery numbering 327 men under Major Jacob Hindman, easily surrounded and captured Fort Erie which was defended only by two weak companies under Major Thomas Buck. After a brigade of 750 volunteers from the militia under Brigadier General Peter B. Porter and 600 Iroquois arrived on July 4, Scott began advancing north along the portage road alongside the Niagara River. A British covering force under Lieutenant Colonel Thomas Pearson was easily driven back before they could destroy any of the bridges or block the road with fallen trees.

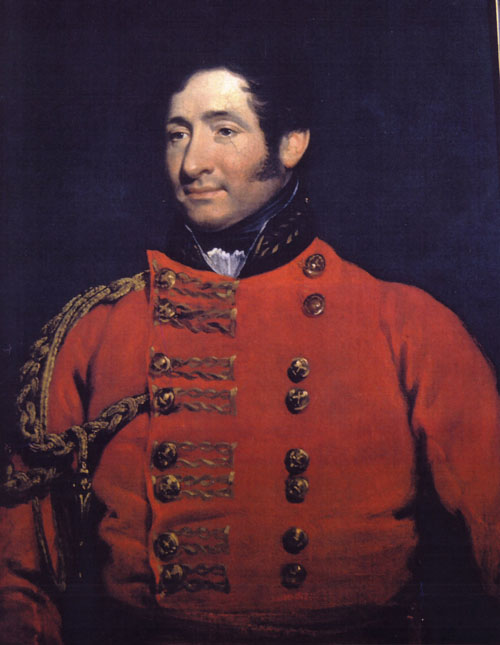
Commanding the Right Division of the British Army in Upper Canada, Major General Phineas Riall assumed the American forces in the area were drawn from the militia.

Late in the day, Scott encountered British defences on the far bank of Chippawa Creek, near the town of Chippawa. After a brief exchange of artillery fire, Scott withdrew a few miles to Street's Creek. Here he planned to give his troops a belated Fourth of July parade the next day, while Brown manoeuvred other units to cross the Chippawa upstream.

Opposed to Scott was the Right Division of the British Army in Upper Canada, under Major General Phineas Riall. Riall believed that Fort Erie was still holding out, and the Americans would therefore have detached large numbers of troops to mask it, leaving only 2,000 men to face his division. He may also have believed that his opponents were militia but was comparatively new to command in Canada and relied on information from Lieutenant Colonel John Harvey, the deputy adjutant general for the forces in Upper Canada, that even the United States regulars were of poor quality. Riall determined to cross the Chippawa River and mount an attack to drive the Americans back across the Niagara and relieve Fort Erie.

== Battle ==
Early on July 5, British light infantry, militia and Indians crossed the Chippawa ahead of Riall's main body and began sniping at Scott's outposts from the woods to their west. (Some of them nearly captured Scott, who was having breakfast in a farmhouse.) Brown ordered Porter's brigade and Indians to clear the woods. They did so, but they met Riall's advancing regulars and hastily retreated.

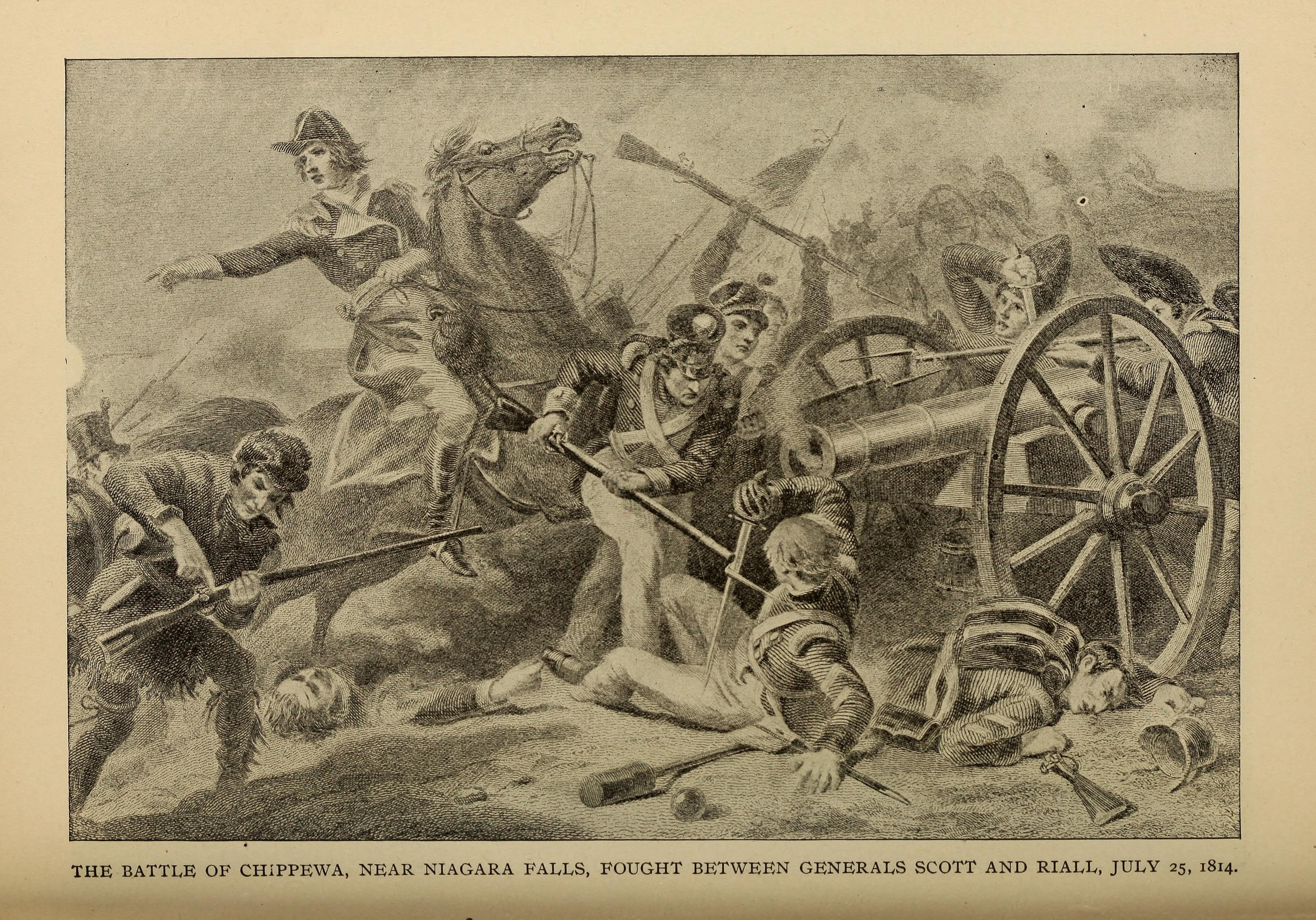
Depiction of the Battle of Chippawa from 1899.

Scott was already advancing from Street's Creek. His artillery (Captain Nathaniel Towson's company, with three 12-pounder guns) deployed on the portage road and opened fire. Riall's own guns (two light 24-pounder guns and a 5.5-inch howitzer) attempted to reply, but Towson's guns destroyed an ammunition wagon and put most of the British guns out of action.

Meanwhile, Scott's troops deployed into line with the 25th U.S. Infantry on the left near the woods, the 11th U.S. Infantry and 9th U.S. Infantry in the centre and the grey-clad 22nd U.S. Infantry on the right with Towson's guns. At first, Riall was under the impression that the American line was composed of grey-clad militia troops, whom the professional British soldiers held in much contempt. He expected the poorly trained soldiers to fall back in disarray after the first few volleys. But the American line held steady under British artillery fire.

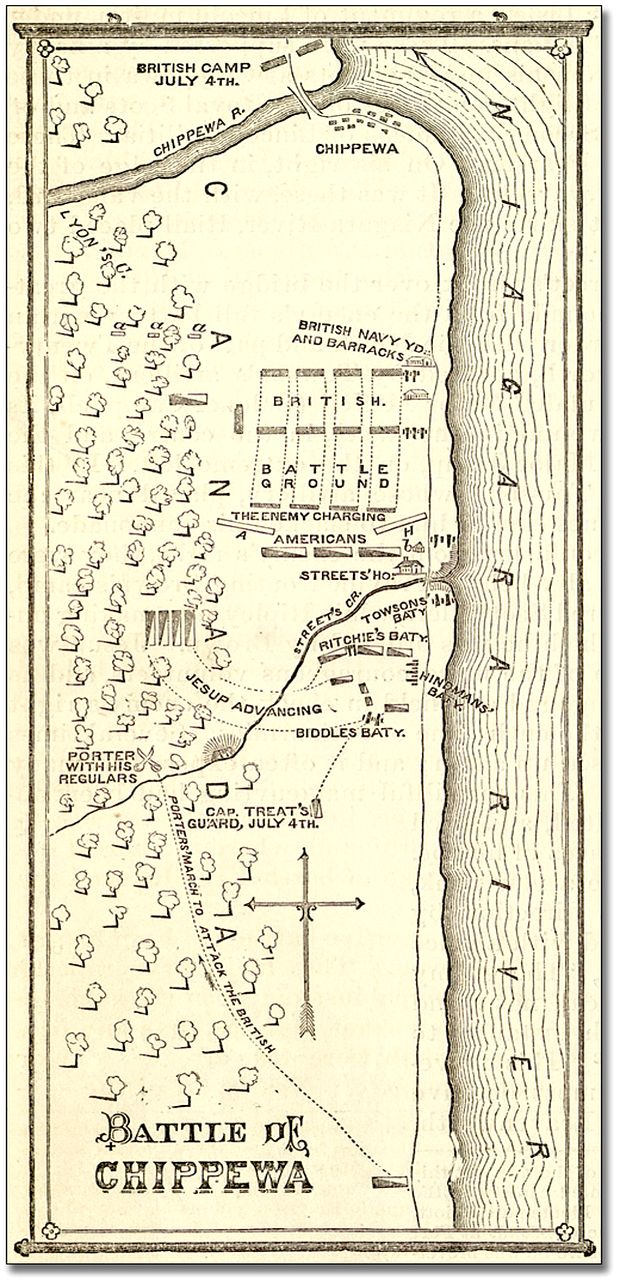
Map of the Battle of Chippawa.

The British infantry, with the 1st (Royal Scots) Foot and the 100th Foot leading and the 8th (King's) Foot in reserve, advanced in line, becoming disordered over the grassy, uneven ground. This slowed them and put them under fire from the American artillery for longer. Riall sacrificed the advantage of greater firepower (versus advancing in column) by ordering his infantry to fire only one volley before closing with the bayonet. As the 1st and 100th Regiments moved forward, their own artillery had to stop firing to avoid hitting them. Meanwhile, the American gunners switched from firing roundshot to firing canister. Once the opposing lines had closed to less than 100 yards, Scott advanced his wings, forming his brigade into a "U" shape which allowed his flanking units to catch Riall's advancing troops in a heavy crossfire.

Both lines stood and fired repeated volleys; after 25 minutes of this pounding Riall, his own coat pierced by a bullet, ordered a withdrawal. The 1/8th, which had been moving to the right of the other two regiments, formed line to cover their retreat. As they in turn fell back, three British 6-pounder guns came into action to cover their withdrawal, with two more 6-pounders firing from the entrenchments north of the Chippawa. Scott halted his brigade, although some of Porter's Iroquois pursued the British almost to the Chippawa.

=== Casualties ===
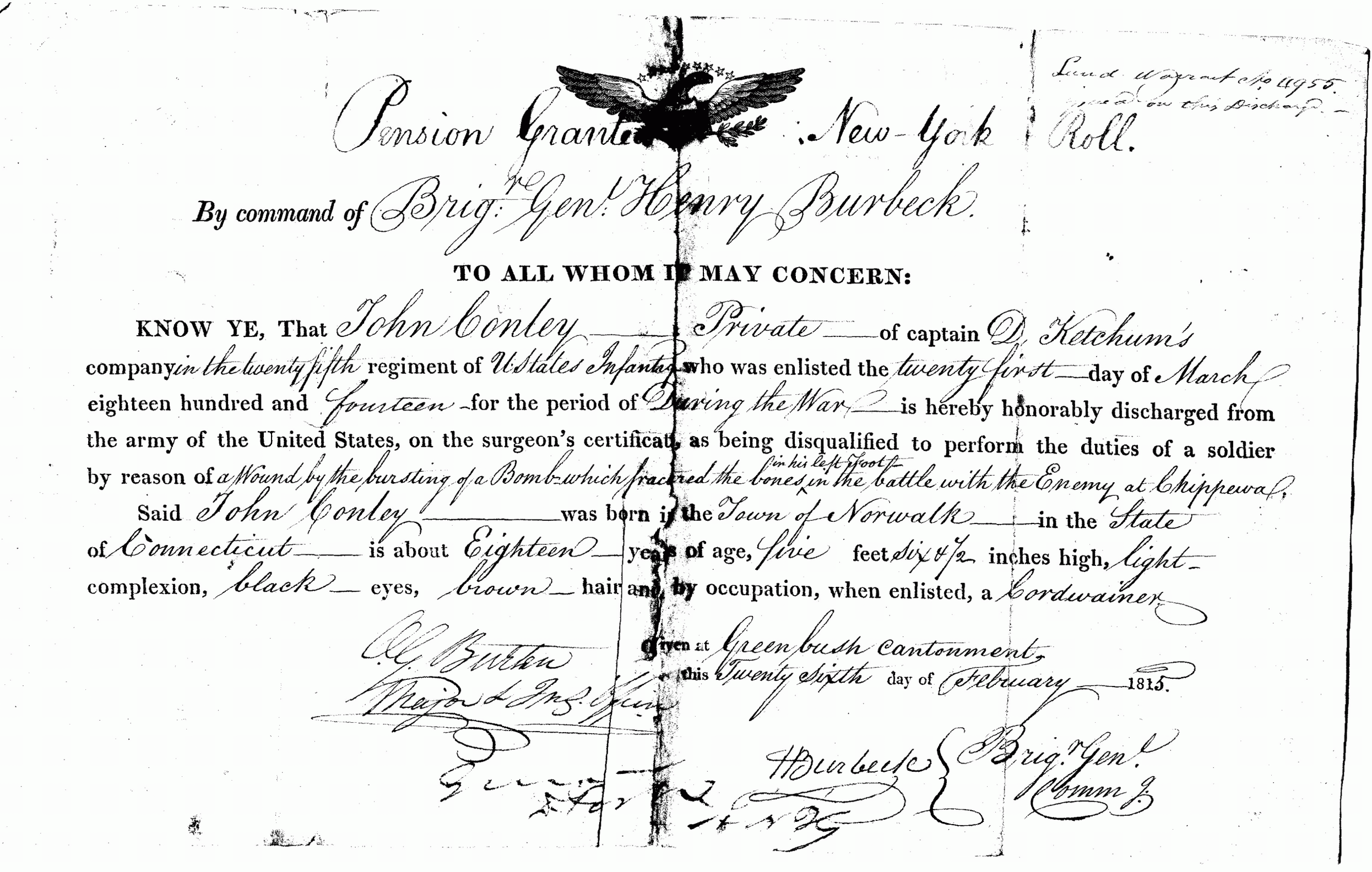
17-year-old soldier "Wound by the bursting of a Bomb". New York Pension Roll, 1815.

The American official casualty return stated the loss as 60 killed, 249 wounded and 19 missing.

British losses had been heavy; the 100th Regiment, which held the centre, was reduced to ...one Captain & 3 subalterns doing duty, with 250 effective men. The official casualty return gave 148 killed, 321 wounded and 46 missing. However, 20th century research by Canadian archivist Douglas Hendry has demonstrated that the British casualty return for Chippawa marked down many men as killed who had in fact been captured, and that of 136 British regulars who were supposed to have been killed, only 74 actually died. The official return gave 12 Canadian militiamen killed but Donald Graves has determined that 18 actually died. A U.S. Army document signed by Assistant Inspector-General Azariah Horne states the Americans had captured 3 officers and 72 "rank and file" of the British regulars who were wounded and 9 British regulars, 1 "captain of the Indians", 1 Indian chief and 4 Indian warriors who were not wounded. Two British officers, Captains Bird and Wilson, appear in the official casualty list in the "wounded" category with additional information that they have also been taken prisoner. The actual British loss at Chippawa therefore appears to have been 74 regulars, 18 Canadian militiamen and 16 Indian warriors killed; 303 British regulars (not including Captains Bird and Wilson, who come under the 'wounded prisoners' category), 16 Canadian militiamen and an unknown number of Indian warriors wounded; 75 British regulars (including Captains Bird and Wilson) wounded and captured by the Americans; 9 British regulars, one officer of the British Indian Department and 5 Indian warriors taken prisoner unwounded. A further 9 British soldiers and 9 Canadian militiamen appear to have deserted. This gives a grand total of 108 killed, 319 wounded, 75 wounded prisoners, 15 unwounded prisoners and 18 missing.

== Aftermath ==
Two days after the battle, Brown completed his original intended maneuver and crossed the Chippawa upstream of Riall's defenses, forcing the British to fall back to Fort George. It was not possible to attack this fortified British position because Commodore Chauncey was still failing to support the American army on the Niagara peninsula. No reinforcements or siege artillery could be brought to Brown's army. At the same time, the British were able to rush reinforcements to the Niagara front and soon became too strong for Brown to risk a direct attack. Eventually, a series of feints and maneuvers led to the Battle of Lundy's Lane a few weeks later.

== Legacy ==
Chippawa Battlefield Park

The Battle of Chippawa proved the worthiness of American regulars when pitted against their British counterparts, and the fearsome effectiveness of American marksmanship:

The best test of British and American military qualities, both for men and weapons, was Scott's battle of Chippawa. Nothing intervened to throw a doubt over the fairness of the trial. Two parallel lines of regular soldiers, practically equal in numbers, armed with similar weapons, moved in close order toward each other, across a wide open plain, without cover or advantage of position, stopping at intervals to load and fire, until one line broke and retired. **** Marksmanship decided the result, and the returns proved that the American fire was superior to that of the British in the proportion of more than fifty per cent if estimated by the entire loss, and of two hundred and forty-two to one hundred if estimated by the deaths alone.

It is generally considered that Riall, although misled as to the strength of the American forces and their quality advanced overconfidently, and his mistaken tactics led to the heavy British casualties.

The 25th Infantry was later combined with the 27th, 29th and 37th Infantry Regiments to form the 6th Infantry Regiment. The 6th Infantry's motto is "Regulars, by God" from this battle.

Ten active regular infantry battalions of the United States Army (1–2 Inf, 2-2 Inf, 1–3 Inf, 2–3 Inf, 4-3 Inf, 1–5 Inf, 2–5 Inf, 1–6 Inf, 2–6 Inf and 4–6 Inf) perpetuate the lineages of American infantry regiments (the old 9th, 11th, 19th, 21st, 22nd and 23rd Infantry Regiments) that were at the Battle of Chippawa.

The Corps of Cadets of the United States Military Academy at West Point wear gray parade uniforms, but the assertion that they were adopted in commemoration of Scott's troops at Chippawa appears to be a legend, possibly started by General Scott himself. The reasons given in 1815 for its selection were simply that it wore well and was considerably cheaper than the blue one.

The site is preserved in the Chippawa Battlefield Park, a unit of the Niagara Parks Commission, with a battle monument and interpretive plaques south of Niagara Falls in the town of Chippawa, Ontario. The site of the battle was designated a National Historic Site of Canada in 1921.

Chippewa Square in Savannah, Georgia, is named for the battle.

== Sources ==
- Cruikshank, Ernest A. (1971). A Documentary History of the Campaigns on the Niagara Frontier in the Year 1814. New York: Arno Press Inc. ISBN 0-405-02838-5.
- Elting, John R (1995). Amateurs to Arms: A military history of the war of 1812. New York: Da Capo Press. ISBN 0-306-80653-3.
- Graves, Donald E. (1994). Red Coats & Grey Jackets: The Battle of Chippawa. Toronto & Oxford: Dundurn Press. ISBN 1-55002-210-5.
- Graves, Donald E. (1993). The Battle of Lundy's Lane on the Niagara in 1814. Baltimore, Maryland: The Nautical & Aviation Publishing. ISBN 1-877853-22-4.
- Hitsman, J. Mackay; Donald E. Graves (1999). The Incredible War of 1812. Toronto: Robin Brass Studio. ISBN 1-896941-13-3.
- Latimer, Jon (2007). 1812: War with America. Cambridge, MA: Belknap/Harvard University Press. ISBN 978-0-674-02584-4.
- Wood, William (1968). Select British Documents of the Canadian War of 1812. Volume III, Part 1. New York: Greenwood Press.
