= Phineas Riall =

British Army officer and colonial administrator

General Sir Phineas Riall KCH
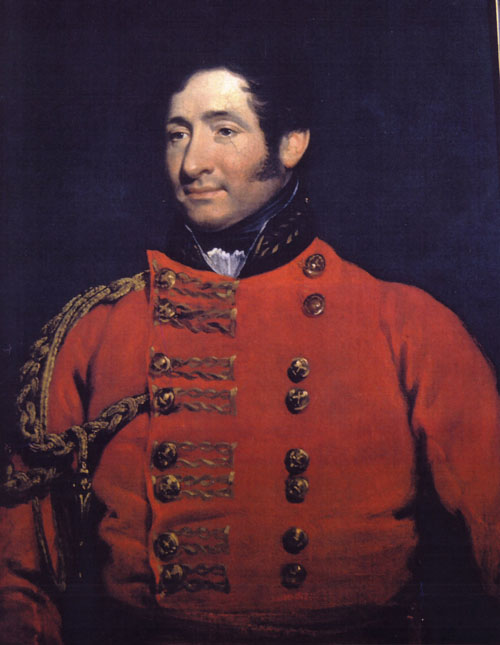
- c. 1815 portrait

Lieutenant Governor of Grenada
- In office c. 1816 – c. 1823
- Governor: Henry Warde; James Frederick Lyon
- Preceded by: Charles Shipley
- Succeeded by: James Campbell

Personal details
- Born: 15 December 1775 Clonmel, County Tipperary, Ireland
- Died: 10 November 1850 (aged 74) Paris, France
- Spouse: Elizabeth Scarlett (m. 1819)
- Children: George; Arthur; Charles
- Parent(s): Phineas Riall (father); Catherine Caldwell (Mother)
- Relatives: George Cockburn (Cousin)
- Awards: Knight Commander of the Royal Guelphic Order

Military service
- Allegiance: Great Britain; United Kingdom
- Branch/service: British Army
- Years of service: 1794–1814
- Rank: General
- Battles/wars: War of 1812; Battle of Lewiston; Battle of Buffalo; Battle of Chippawa; Battle of Lundy's Lane (POW)

General Sir Phineas Riall, KCH (15 December 1775 – 10 November 1850) was a British Army officer and colonial administrator who served as the lieutenant governor of Grenada from 1816 until 1823. He is best known for serving in the War of 1812, where Riall was captured at the Battle of Lundy's Lane.

== Life ==
Riall was born at Clonmel, County Tipperary, into a wealthy Protestant landowning family. He was the third son of Phineas Riall (1737–1797) of Heywood, County Tipperary, whose father had founded the Riall Bank of Clonmel. His mother, Catherine, was the daughter of Charles Caldwell of Dublin and a sister of Admiral Sir Benjamin Caldwell. He was a cousin and from 1790 the brother-in-law of the traveller, author and collector General Sir George Cockburn of Shanganagh Castle, County Dublin.

Riall entered the army as an ensign in 1794 and rose rapidly through purchased commissions. Even though he spent seven years on half pay (i.e. without any regimental or staff appointment), he was a major in the 15th Regiment of Foot in 1805. He sailed with them to the West Indies, and seems to have first seen serious action when he commanded the regiment at the capture of Martinique in 1809. The next year, he commanded a brigade at the capture of Guadeloupe. After this, he returned to England.

Over the next two years, he received promotion to colonel and major general through seniority. He was then posted to Canada, where initially he commanded the Montreal district, then accompanied Lieutenant General Drummond to Upper Canada.

On arrival, Drummond immediately halted all withdrawals and mounted an attack on the American side of the Niagara River. As part of the attack, Riall led a detachment across the river at Lewiston on 19 December 1813 and advanced south. The attack was almost unopposed, as the Americans had stripped the Niagara front of regular soldiers to furnish an ill-fated attack on Montreal. The advance was marked by the burning of almost every village, in reprisal for the American burning of Newark ten days earlier.

On 30 December, Riall again crossed the Niagara River further south, and repeated the deliberate destruction at Buffalo and Black Rock, although here there were a Navy yard and several other legitimate military targets.

On 5 July 1814, Riall commanded the "Right Division" of the British Army in Upper Canada, on the Niagara river. At the Battle of Chippawa, he ordered them to attack Winfield Scott's advancing American brigade. The result was a bloody defeat for the British. Riall's tactics might have been correct had he faced American militia, as he thought, but were disastrous against Scott's well-trained regulars.

On 25 July, Riall's troops once again engaged Scott at the Battle of Lundy's Lane. Riall was severely wounded in the arm early in the battle, and while riding to the rear, was captured by American infantry. While he was a prisoner, a fellow captive (Canadian militia dragoon officer William Hamilton Merritt) described him as "very brave, near sighted, rather short, but stout." He was allowed to sail for England on parole in December.

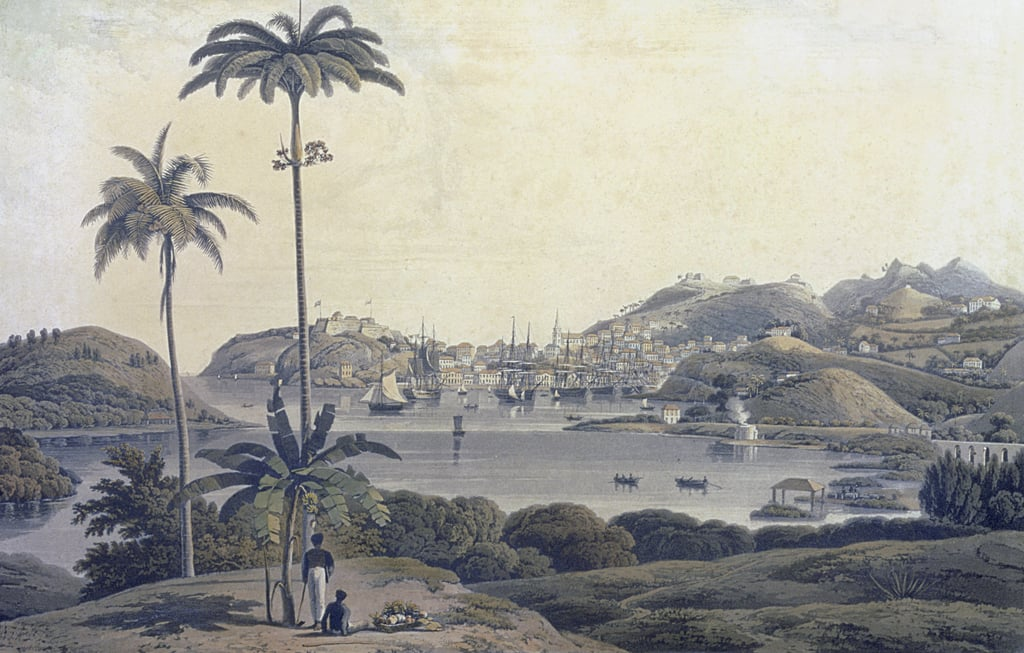
A View of the Town of St George on the Island of Grenada taken from the Belmont Estate, dedicated to Riall and published in 1819

On 18 February 1816, he was appointed Governor of Grenada, a post he held until 1823. Thereafter, he appears to have seen very little service, although he was knighted in 1833 and eventually became full general on 23 November 1841. He was also successively Colonel of the 74th Regiment of Foot (1835–1846) and the 15th (Yorkshire East Riding) Regiment of Foot (1846 to his death). In 1836, he received compensation on behalf of his wife for slaves "hired upon Peru Estate" in Trelawny, Jamaica. He died peacefully in Paris in 1850.

Military offices
Preceded by Sir Moore Disney	Colonel of the 15th (the Yorkshire East Riding) Regiment of Foot; 1846–1850	Succeeded by Sir Henry Watson
Preceded by Sir James Campbell	Colonel of the 74th (Highland) Regiment of Foot; 1835–1846	Succeeded by Sir Alexander Cameron
Government offices
Preceded by George Paterson acting	Lieutenant Governor of Grenada; 1816–1823	Succeeded by George Paterson acting
