= Here Will I Nest =

- Directed by: Melburn Turner
- Written by: Hilda Mary Hooke
- Based on: Here Will I Nest; 1938 play by Hilda Mary Hooke
- Produced by: Melburn Turner
- Starring: John Burton
- Cinematography: Melburn Turner
- Edited by: Melburn Turner
- Release date: 31 March 1942
- Running time: 90 minutes
- Country: Canada
- Language: English
- Budget: $5,000

Here Will I Nest or Talbot of Canada is a 1942 Canadian film directed by Melburn Turner based on the 1938 play by Hilda Mary Hooke. It was the first dramatic Canadian feature-length film made in colour and the first film to adapt a Canadian play. The film is mostly lost with the exception of 15 minutes from the first reel.

The film follows the life of Thomas Talbot and his colonization of Canada. Hooke and Turner were members of the same dramatic societies. Turner directed, shot, and edited the film with a $5,000 budget. It was shown at private screenings, including at Mitchell Hepburn's house, but was not commercially released.

== Synopsis ==
Thomas Talbot, at age 22, is in a romance with Susanne Johnson, the niece of Mohawk Chief Joseph Brant. However, racism leads to the end of their relationship. Talbot enters a relationship with Princess Amelia of the United Kingdom, but breaks up with her. Talbot, now 39, greets the first settlers from Europe after spending six years on the shores of Lake Erie.

== Cast ==
- John Burton as Thomas Talbot
- Robina Richardson as Susanne Johnson
- George Simpson as George Crane
- Campbell Calder as Mahlon Burwell
- William Hitchens as Jeffrey Hunter
- Alex Burr as Jeremy Crandall
- E.S. Detwiler as William Hatch
- Earl Gray as Simon McAllister
- Ralph Gray as Robert McAllister
- John Sullivan as John Pearce
- Bernice Harper as Fanny Pearce
- Mary Ashwell as Isabella Pearce

== Production ==
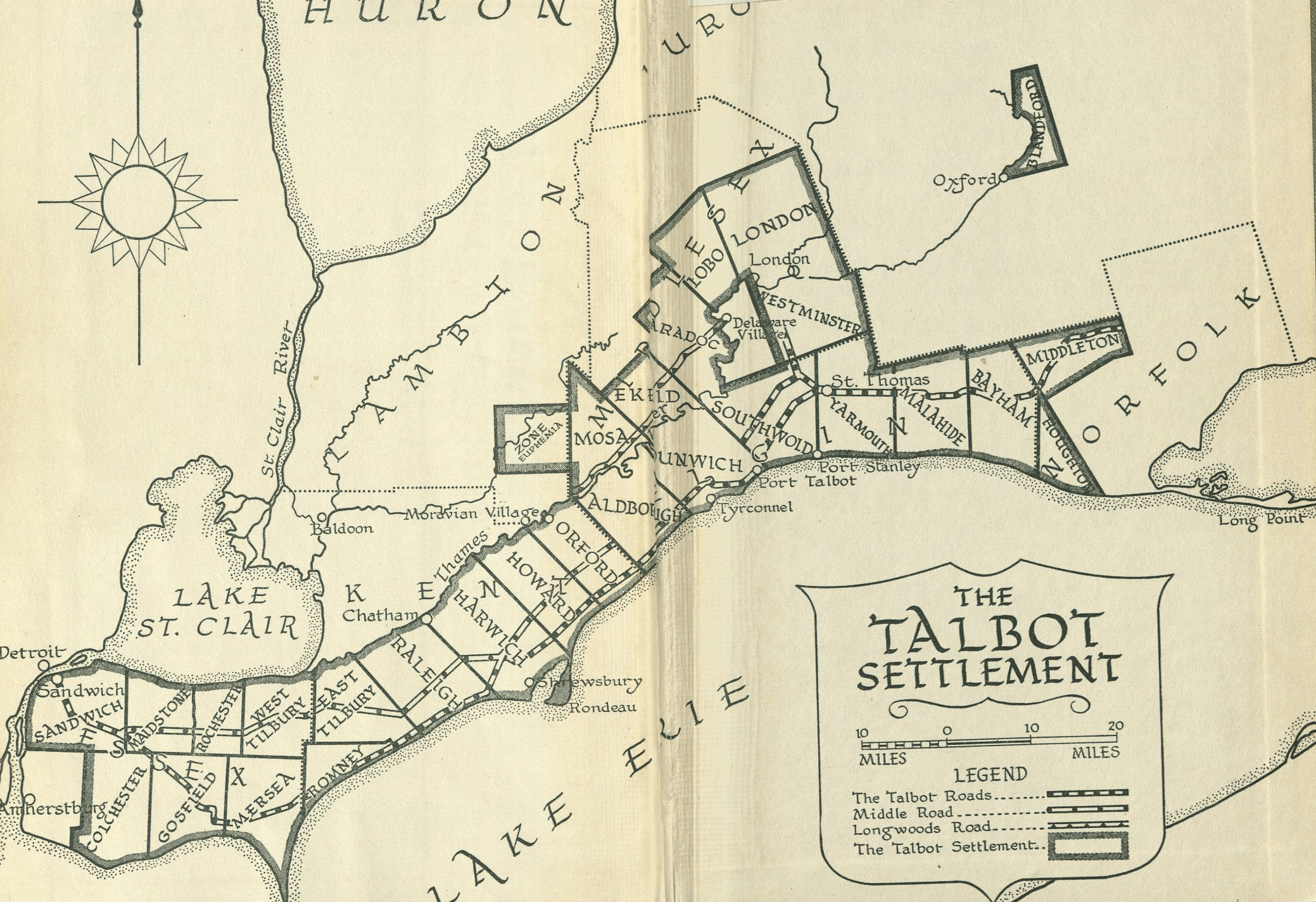
Map of settlements founded by Thomas Talbot

Hilda Mary Hooke's stage play Here Will I Nest, based on the life of Thomas Talbot, premiered at the London Little Theatre on 14 November 1938. She wrote a screenplay based on her play. It was the first film to adapt a Canadian play and was the only English-language film adaptation of a Canadian play until Fortune and Men's Eyes (1971). Chris Doty compared Here Will I Nest to Gone with the Wind (1939) and stated that it was the first attempt to tell a Canadian national story in film.

Melburn Turner was a member of the same dramatical societies as Hooke. He directed, shot, and edited the film. Filming was done in Byron and London, Ontario, during the summer of 1941 on a budget of $5,000 (equivalent to $96,588 in 2025). Talbot's cabin in Port Talbot, Ontario was not used as a shooting location as renovations drastically changed it from the original; a cabin in Poplar Hill was used instead. Here Will I Nest was shot using 16 mm Kodachrome film and was the first dramatic feature-length film in Canada to be shot in colour. Turner later made The Immortal Scoundrel, the first Canadian feature-length colour film in French.

Peter Morris described the film as being an amateur production. The audio was recorded by a high school teacher, but there was an electronic tone buzzing through the film due to a technical mistake.

"Here will I nest" was stated by Talbot when he cut down a tree to mark his new settlement. Turner stated that the original title was Talbot of Canada and that it premiered under that name. However, The London Free Press' review of the film did not mention this title. Turner changed the name of the film as he felt Here Will I Nest did not mean anything.

== Release ==
The film premiered on 31 March 1942, at a private showing at the Elsie Perrin Williams Memorial Library in London. Two synchronized projectors were used for the screening, with one showing picture and the other playing audio, as Turner could not afford a single print with both visuals and audio. Turner, who was the projectionist for the event, had to remove all of his clothing except for his underwear due to the heat in the room. The only other screening of the film was in the home of Mitchell Hepburn, who fell asleep halfway through the film. It was not commercially released.

Most of the film was destroyed by a fire in the 1970s. The first reel of the film was donated to the Library and Archives Canada by Turner in 1979, but it was missing its audio. The film was believed to be completely lost until 17 March 1998, when Doty discovered 15–16 minutes of the film with no audio in the Library and Archives Canada. His restoration had lip readers determine what words were being said by the actors and then had 16 people redub them. Only a few pages of the original script survive. This restoration was shown at the Museum London on 27 March 2003.

== Works cited ==
=== Books ===
- Loiselle, André (2003). Stage-Bound: Feature Film Adaptations of Canadian and Québécois Drama. McGill–Queen's University Press. doi:10.1515/9780773571464. ISBN 9780773571464.
- Morris, Peter, ed. (1970). Canadian Feature Films: 1913-69. Canadian Film Institute.
- Morris, Peter, ed. (1978). Embattled Shadows: A History of Canadian Cinema 1895-1939. McGill–Queen's University Press. ISBN 9780773560727.
- Turner, D. John, ed. (1987). Canadian Feature Film Index: 1913-1985. Canadian Film Institute. ISBN 0660533642.

=== News ===
- Culbert, Jeff (27 March 2003). "Here's to You, Hilda Mary Hooke (1897–1978)". Theatre In London. Archived from the original on 2 June 2025.
- Gallagher, Noel (2003). "Talbot film our Gone with the Wind" (PDF). The London Free Press. Archived (PDF) from the original on 18 July 2025.
- Smith, Stephen (June 24, 1989). "A director 'by guess and by God'". The Kingston Whig-Standard. p. 11 – via Newspapers.com.
- Reid, Michael (February 1, 1992). "Film pioneer overcome with deja vu at Robe epic". Times Colonist. p. C1 – via Newspapers.com.

=== Web ===
- Doty, Chris. "Talbot of Canada Our first colour feature film". United States House of Representatives. Archived from the original on May 30, 2026.
