= Lewis Burwell =

Lewis Burwell may refer to:

- Lewis Burwell (colonist), Virginia politician and colonist
- Lewis Burwell (Upper Canada), left the nascent USA and fought against the US, with his brother Mahlon Burwell

== See also ==
- Burwell family of Virginia, four members named Lewis Burwell in the 17th and 18th century
