= Port Talbot (disambiguation) =

Port Talbot is an industrial town in Wales.

Port Talbot may also refer to:

- Port Talbot Steelworks, an integrated steel production plant in Port Talbot
- Port Talbot (district), one of four local government districts in West Glamorgan
- Port Talbot (electoral ward), an electoral ward of Neath Port Talbot County Borough
- Port Talbot, Ontario, a community located west of Port Stanley
- Port Talbot Town F.C., a football club playing in the Welsh Premier League
