= Hilda Mary Hooke =

Canadian playwright and poet (1898–1978)

Hilda Hooke Smith
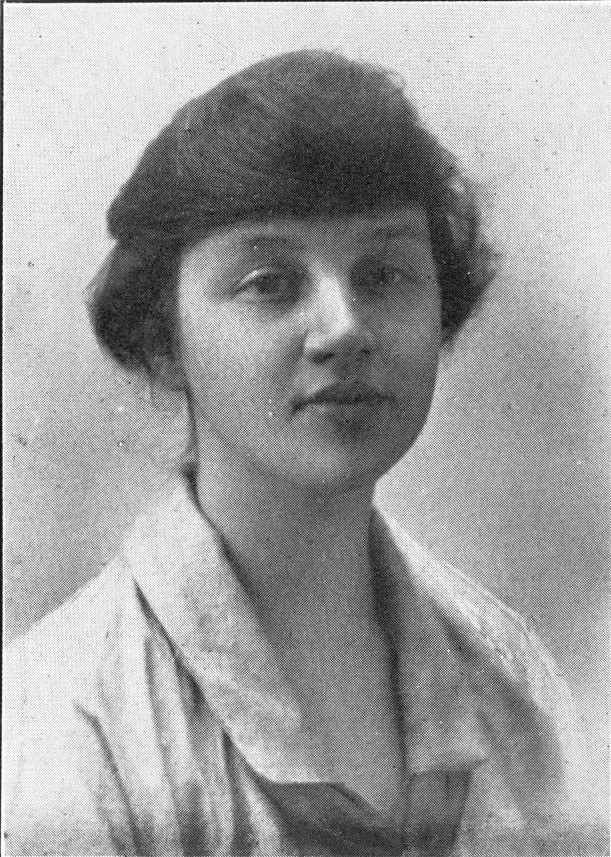
- Hooke in 1919
- Born: Hilda Mary Hooke; 3 October 1898; Odcombe, Somerset, England
- Died: 1978 (aged 79–80); Comox, British Columbia, Canada
- Occupation: writer
- Spouse: Richard Tapscott Smith (m. 1925)
- Writing career
- Language: English
- Genres: dramas; poetry

Signature
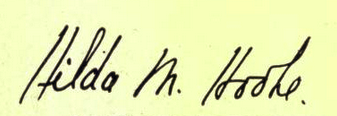

Hilda Mary Hooke (after marriage, Smith; 3 October 1898 – 1978) was an English-born Canadian writer of dramas, poetry, and prose. Her 1938 play, Here Will I Nest was adapted into Canada's first colour feature-length motion picture, for which she wrote the screenplay. Hooke died in 1978.

== Biography ==
Hilda Mary Hooke was born at Odcombe, Somerset, England, 3 October 1898. Her parents were Oswald Edgar Smith and Louisa Elizth (Tapscott) Smith. She came to Canada in 1902.

For some years after her arrival, she was engaged in musical and dramatic work. Hooke was affiliated with the Little Theatre in London, Ontario, since the 1920s as producer, director, and playwright. Here Will I Nest, first performed in 1938, became the first Canadian play to be adapted into a motion picture. She wrote three plays around the central figure of Lord Talbot and another three centered on Dr. John Troyer.

Later in her writing career, she became a poet. She also wrote a book about folklore (Thunder in the Mountains: Legends of Canada).

While serving as secretary to the Chief Inspector of Public Schools, London, Ontario, she published less. In 1946, she also served as secretary to Canon Quintin Warner.

On 26 September 1925, she married Richard Tapscott Smith. She died in Comox, British Columbia, 1978.

== Selected works ==
=== Plays ===
- Here Will I Nest, 1938
- A Time of Grace: A Play in Three Acts, 1941
- One-Act Plays from Canadian History, 1942
- The Streamlined Madonna, 1946
- Legend, 1949

=== Screenplays ===
- Here Will I Nest (alt. Talbot of Canada), 1942

=== Prose ===
- Thunder in the Mountains: Legends of Canada, 1947

=== Song lyrics ===
- "The challenger. A part song for mixed voices.", 1919 (music by Peter C. Lutkin)
