= Mahlon Burwell =

Canadian politician

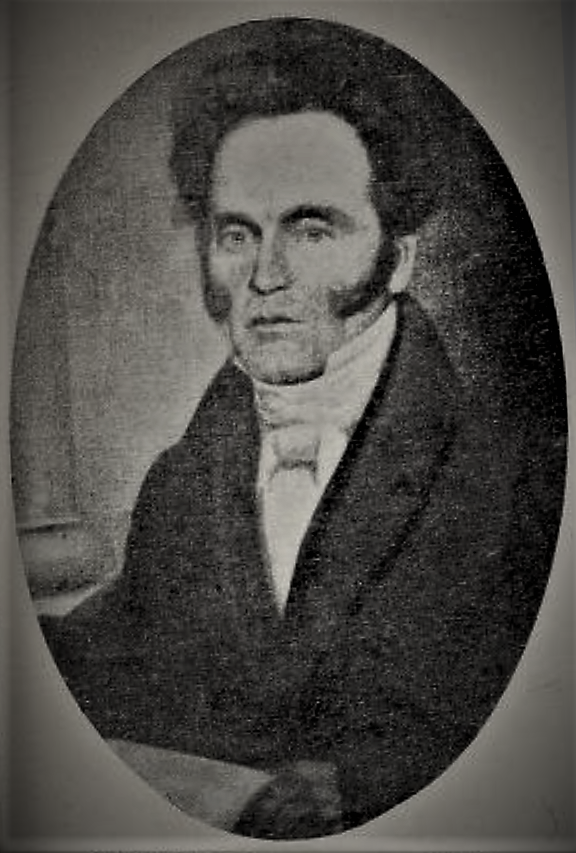

Mahlon Burwell (February 18, 1783 – January 25, 1846) was a surveyor and political figure in Upper Canada.

He was born in New Jersey in 1783 and came to Upper Canada with his family in 1796. He was largely self-schooled and was employed by the government of the province to survey the Talbot settlement and the Talbot Road in 1809 and settled near Port Talbot some time after that. During the War of 1812, he served in the 1st Middlesex Militia, was captured by raiders and his property was destroyed. After the war, he continued his survey work in Kent and Essex Counties, and on the Talbot Road. This difficult work took its toll on Burwell's health. He was often paid in land, rather than cash, and acquired large land holdings scattered across the southwestern part of the province. In 1830, he laid out the plan for the village of Port Burwell on Lake Erie; he also set up a company to develop the harbour and export timber from the area.

In 1812, he was elected to the 6th Parliament of Upper Canada representing Oxford & Middlesex. He represented the area until 1824 and then again from 1830 to 1834. In 1813, he was appointed justice of the peace. Burwell benefited from his close ties as friend and employee of Thomas Talbot and received other patronage posts in the region. He was ahead of his time in proposing that local taxation be used to support education. In 1836, he was elected to represent the town of London in the Legislative Assembly. In later life, his influence declined possibly as a result of ill health.

Mahlon Burwell provided land on which Trinity Church, an example of early Gothic Revival architecture, was constructed in 1836. Until the arrival of the Reverend Thomas Read in 1843, the congregation of Trinity Church was served by travelling missionaries.

He died at Port Talbot in 1846.

His son Leonidas served as a member of the Legislative Assembly of the Province of Canada.

His younger brother, Lewis Burwell, assisted him as a surveyor, and was later Upper Canada's deputy surveyor.
