= Canadian units of the War of 1812 =

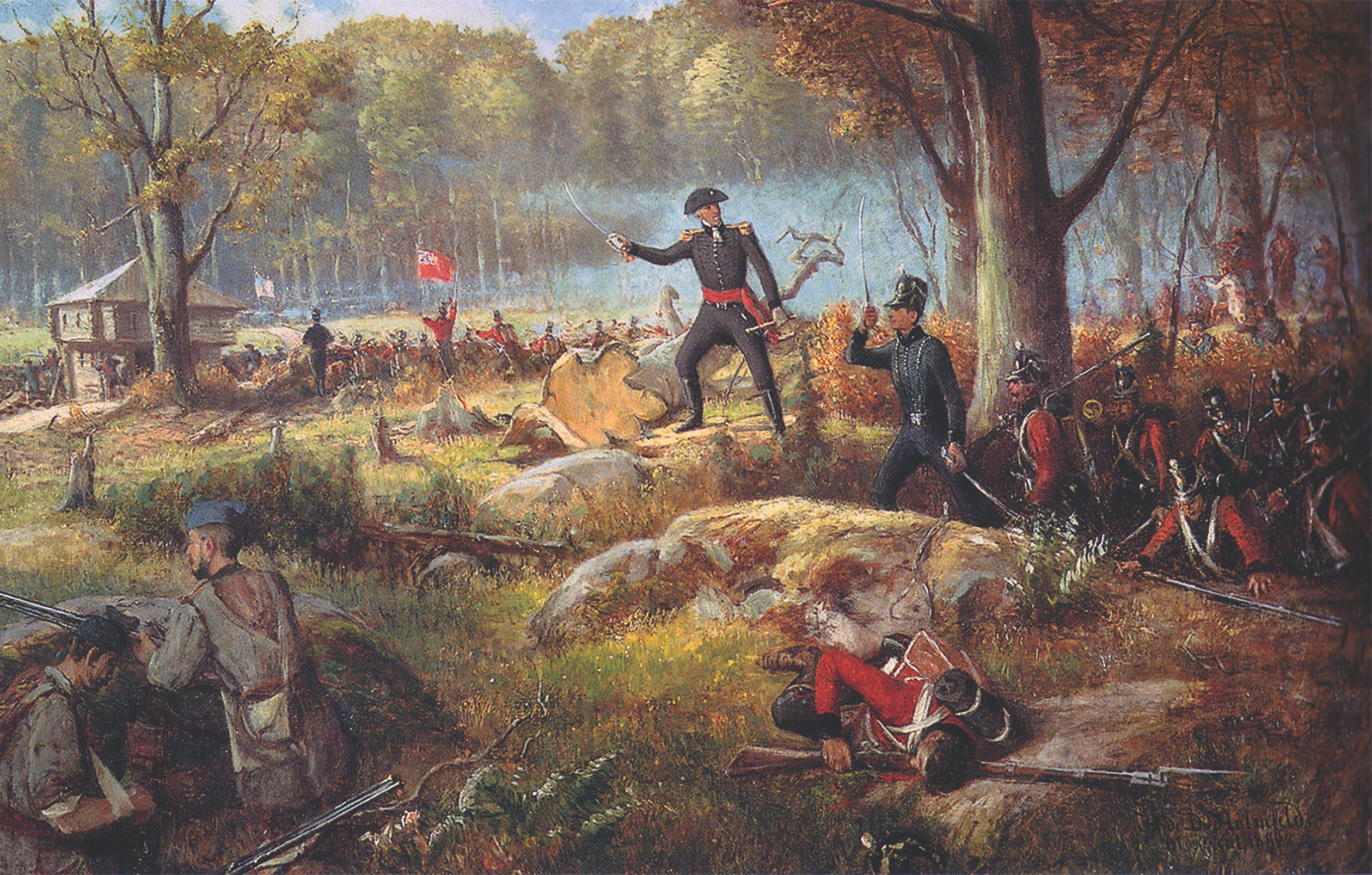
Canadian militia and fencibles at the Battle of the Chateauguay

When the United States and the United Kingdom went to war against each other in 1812, the major land theatres of war were Upper Canada (broadly the southern portion of the present day province of Ontario), Michigan Territory, Lower Canada (roughly the southern part of present-day Quebec) and the Maritime Provinces of Nova Scotia, New Brunswick, Prince Edward Island and Cape Breton (colony between 1784 and 1820). Each of the separate British administrations formed regular and fencible units, and both full-time and part-time militia units, many of which played a major part in the fighting over the two and a half years of the war. All told, pay lists, muster rolls and other documents list about 45,000 names of individuals serving in Canadian Militia units (not including locally-recruited Fencible regiments of the British Army) during the war.

== Fencibles ==
Fencibles were military units raised on the same terms as regular troops, but liable for service only in North America.

=== Atlantic provinces ===
==== New Brunswick Regiment of Fencible Infantry ====
This regiment was raised in 1803. Although established as Fencibles, the regiment volunteered for general service, and became the 104th (New Brunswick) Regiment of Foot in the British Army in 1810. Nevertheless, they served in North America only. Their red uniforms had buff facings.

The unit was trained in light infantry tactics with the intention of being formally converted to light infantry. Like light infantry units, they used bugles instead of drums to pass commands on the battlefield. There were many skilled axe-men and boatmen in the regiment. Their pre-war training also emphasized winter manoeuvres and amphibious operations.

They made an epic winter march from Fredericton to Kingston in early 1813. Detachments from the regiment fought at the Battle of Sackett's Harbor and in the various campaigns on the Niagara peninsula. The flank companies suffered heavy casualties in a failed storming attempt during the Siege of Fort Erie.

The unit was disbanded in 1817. The regiment is commemorated within the Canadian Army by the Royal New Brunswick Regiment which also carries the Niagara battle honour awarded to the regiment in the aftermath of the conflict for its contribution on the Niagara peninsula, particularly at the Battle of Lundy's Lane.

Another unit, also known as the New Brunswick Fencibles, was formed in 1813 to garrison various posts in the Maritime Provinces, and was disbanded in 1816.

==== Nova Scotia Fencibles ====
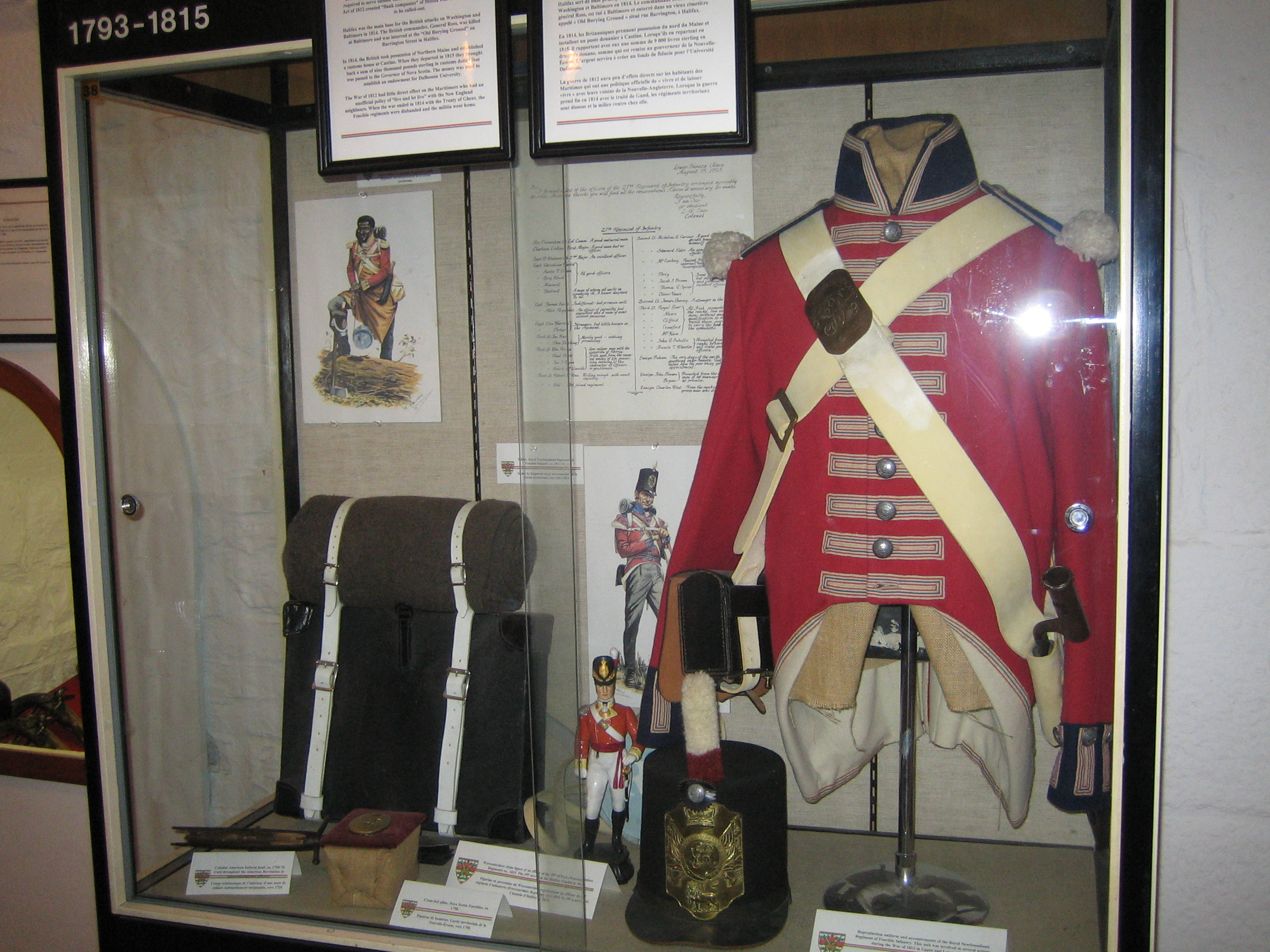
A diorama at the Halifax Citadel featuring pieces of equipment used by the Nova Scotia Fencibles, and the Royal Newfoundland Regiment of Fencible Infantry.

The Nova Scotia Fencibles was raised in 1803. The unit had red uniforms with yellow facings. Although posted to Kingston in Upper Canada in 1814, the regiment did not see action and was disbanded in 1816.

Half the unit, some 210 officers and other ranks, together with 48 wives and children, were on board Archduke Charles when she wrecked on 29 May 1816 near Green Island in the Saint Lawrence River. The regiment had marched from Kingston to Quebec and had embarked there for Nova Scotia. Four soldiers, two wives, and two children died; all others were saved. Contemporary accounts referred to the regiment as the Royal Nova Scotia Regiment, which had, however, been disbanded some years earlier.

==== Royal Newfoundland Regiment of Fencible Infantry ====
Although units had been raised in Newfoundland as early as 1795, the regiment which fought in the War of 1812 was officially formed in 1803. Its authorised establishment was 1,000, but it numbered 556 when the war broke out. Many of the regiment's soldiers were expert boatmen, and five companies were sent to Upper Canada in 1812 to serve as marines on the Great Lakes. They fought as such throughout the war, serving at the siege of Detroit, the battle of York, the siege of Fort Meigs and other engagements. A detachment from the regiment suffered heavy casualties at the Battle of Lake Erie. When not serving aboard ships, the regiment was split up into garrisons and detached companies throughout Upper Canada.

A detachment of ninety men from the regiment, with thirty officers and men from the Royal Artillery and twenty-one sailors of the Royal Navy, opened a trail (using old trapper and fur trader routes) from York, the provincial capital of Upper Canada, to the Nottawasaga River during the early month of 1814. The detachment subsequently took part in the Battle of Mackinac Island and the Engagement on Lake Huron.

The unit was disbanded in 1816 though its history and heritage is carried on by the Royal Newfoundland Regiment, which carries the battle honours Detroit, 1812, and Maumee, 1813. As a "royal" unit, it had blue facings to its red coats.

=== The Canadas ===
==== Canadian Fencibles ====
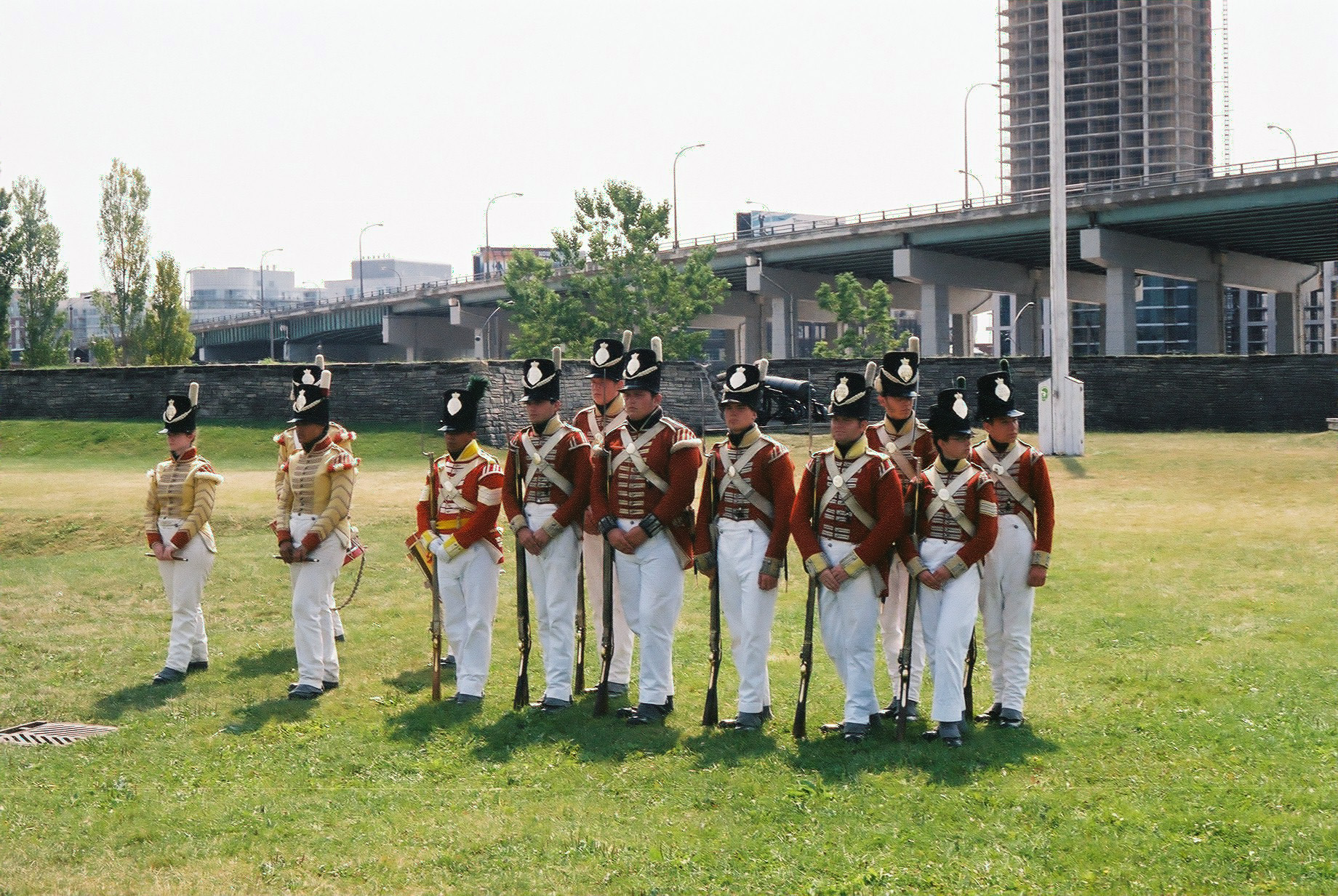
Reenactors at Fort York dressed like the Canadian Regiment of Fencible Infantry.

First recruited in Scotland in 1803. The Scottish recruits feared that they were about to be "crimped" for service in India or other unhealthy posts, and mutinied. Afterwards, the regiment was re-raised amongst the Canadiens of Lower Canada, who became the majority of the men in the unit, however, the majority of the officers and non-commissioned officers were still Scotsmen. This heritage was reflected on the regimental insignia, which included a thistle (along with an acorn in the adjacent position of the crest). The light company fought at the Battle of Châteauguay and the grenadier company at the Battle of Lacolle Mills (1814). A small detachment fought at the Battle of Crysler's Farm and some of the battalion companies served as marines with the squadron on Lake Champlain, in several raids in 1813. The unit was disbanded in 1816. Its red uniforms had yellow facings. The history and heritage of the Canadian Regiment of Fencible Infantry is carried on in the Canadian Army by the Royal 22^{e} Régiment. A modern re-enactment unit is the re-created Regiment of the Canadian Regiment of Fencible Infantry, operating across Canada and the United States.

==== Glengarry Light Infantry ====
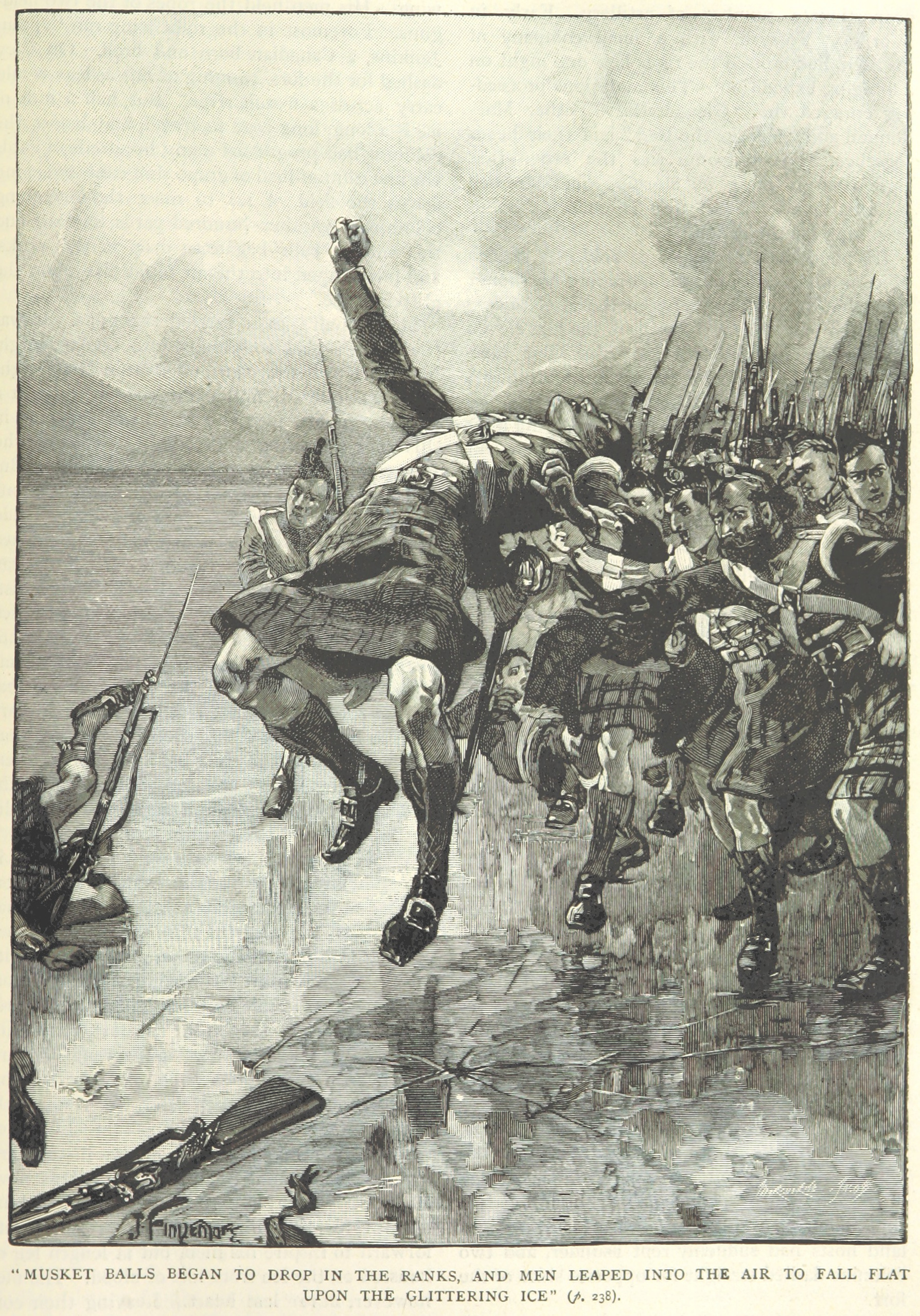
Depiction of the Glengarry Light Infantry during the Battle of Ogdensburg.

Formed by order of Lieutenant-General Sir George Prevost in 1812, recruited from settlements of discharged Scottish soldiers (and some evicted Scottish highlanders) in Glengarry district. Originally intended to wear highlander uniforms (kilts, etc.), they wore the dark green uniform with black facings of the Rifle Brigade instead, although they were armed with muskets rather than rifles.

Companies and detachments fought in several actions in Upper Canada in 1813, and the whole unit fought at the Battle of Lundy's Lane. The unit specialized in British light infantry tactics and thus was well-trained in duties such as skirmishing and concealed sentry duty.

While the unit was disbanded in 1816, its modern descendant within the Canadian Army is The Stormont, Dundas and Glengarry Highlanders. A modern reenactment unit is based in Fort Erie Ontario, on the opposite side of the river from Buffalo, New York.

==== Michigan Fencibles ====
A small unit of 45 men raised at Fort Mackinac in 1813. They served in the west, including at the Siege of Prairie du Chien, and disbanded in 1815. The unit supposedly had a uniform of red coats with black facings, but given the distance from regular supply sources and the hard conditions in which it served, it is unlikely that they ever presented a uniform appearance.

== Quasi-military units ==
Two militarized bodies (the Indian Department and the Provincial Marine) were in existence before any of the Canadian land units that participated in the war were raised.

=== Indian Department ===
This consisted of about 100 officers, whose purpose was to act as agents, envoys or interpreters to the various Native tribes and nations (nowadays referred to in Canada as First Nations).

Many of its personnel took part in actions in which the peoples to whom they were attached participated. They were supposed to wear full dress in action, to prevent them being mistaken for Americans by excited warriors (or being taken for "blue-eyed Indians", renegades and rogue fur traders, by American soldiers). Indian Department officers were indeed often of mixed Native and European ancestry. Some claimed to speak little or no English.

The most well known victory won by Natives fighting directly under British command was the Battle of Beaver Dams in 1813.

=== Provincial Marine ===
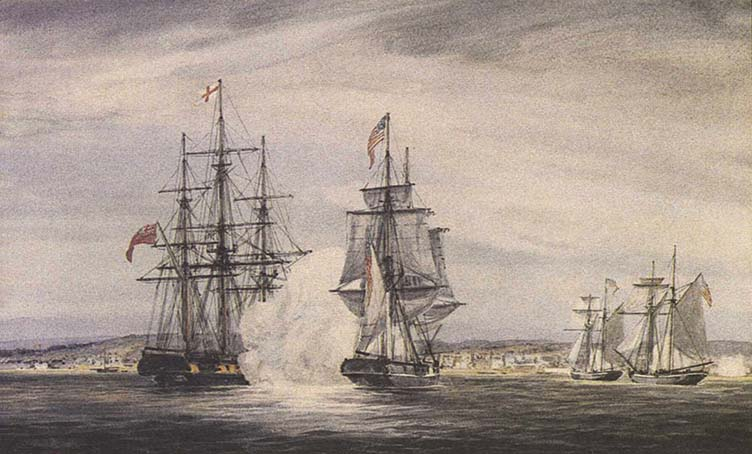
An engagement between HMS Royal George, a vessel of the Provincial Marine, and USS Oneida in Kingston harbour, November 1812.

This had been responsible since the late 18th century for military transport and police duties on the Great Lakes. When war broke out, they possessed:

Lake Ontario

Royal George, ship, 510 tons, 22 guns
Prince Regent, ship, tonnage unknown, 16 guns
Earl of Moira, brig, 262 tons, 14 guns
Duke of Gloucester, brig, 165 tons, 10 guns
Seneca, schooner, tonnage unknown (commandeered trading vessel)
Governor Simcoe, schooner, 187 tons, 8 guns (commandeered trading vessel)

Lake Erie

Queen Charlotte, ship, 400 tons, 17 guns
Lady Prevost, schooner, 230 tons, 13 guns (under construction, joined a few weeks after the outbreak of war)
Hunter, brig, 180 tons, 10 guns

In 1812, the efficiency of the Provincial Marine was described as low, not least because its senior officer was over eighty years old. Nevertheless, the Americans initially had nothing to match it, and it played a major part in the victories of General Isaac Brock. It was expanded during the war, and its officers and sailors played valiant parts in the Battle of Lake Erie and the Battle of Plattsburgh.

== Full-time Militia ==
Various full-time units were formed from members of the Canadian militia. Although usually intended for garrison duty only, several units saw action. All such Militia units were disbanded very soon after the war ended, and their men returned to their former occupations.

Particularly in Upper Canada, ordinary Militia contingents could not be kept in the field for long, especially around harvest time or the planting season when many militia would want to return to work on their farms. This was one reason for the formation of some of the full-time units.

== Full-time Militia: Lower Canada ==
=== Canadian Chasseurs ===
After the 5th battalion of Select Embodied Militia attracted unfavourable reports in 1814 (mainly because of the absence without leave of several of its officers), it was reorganised and reformed as a light infantry unit, the Canadian Chasseurs. Several of the flank companies of other Select Embodied Militia battalions which had already seen much service with the Light Battalions were consolidated into the Chasseurs, while the existing personnel of the 5th battalion were dispersed among the other battalions.

The Chasseurs wore substantially the same uniform as the Voltigeurs and were brigaded with them in the campaign in 1814 which ended with the Battle of Plattsburgh. The unit is perpetuated within the Canadian Army by Les Fusiliers du S^{t}-Laurent.

This unit should not be confused with the Independent Companies of Foreigners, which were raised from among French prisoners of war and served in Chesapeake Bay in 1813, being responsible for several acts of looting and rape, and were given the title "Canadian Chasseurs" by Major-General Sidney Beckwith without authorisation.

=== Canadian Light Dragoons ===
A mounted unit, also known as Coleman's Troop after its commander. Captain Thomas Coleman It saw much action in Upper Canada, though mainly as picquets and despatch riders rather than cavalry.

=== Canadian Voltigeurs ===
The Canadian Voltigeurs had a slightly anomalous position, in that they were supposedly militia and subject to the militia laws and ordinances, but were listed as a regular unit during the war. They were formed from volunteers from the militia by Lieutenant-Colonel Charles de Salaberry in 1812. The Voltigeurs were trained to a high standard and fought in several actions including the Battle of Châteauguay. The unit had a grey uniform (rifle green for officers), with black facings and equipment. Though their unit contained French-speaking Canadians for the majority, their orders were given in English.

Les Voltigeurs de Québec perpetuate the history and heritage of the Canadian Voltigeurs within the Canadian Army.

=== Compagnie des Guides ===
A small company of volunteer cavalry.

=== Corps of Canadian Voyageurs ===
Originally raised by William McKay from among the boatmen of the North West Fur Company, to move military supplies west from Quebec and Montreal. The Corps numbered about 400, and was involved in several skirmishes with American raiders during the winter of 1812–1813. In 1813, responsibility for transport was transferred to the Commissariat, and the Corps was disbanded and reformed as the Provincial Commissariat Voyageurs.

During the war, members of this corps took part in actions on the Saint Lawrence River, and journeyed far up the Ottawa River to reach Lake Huron. They had no recognised uniform and wore practical clothing as the season required. They also determinedly resisted any attempt to make them conform to any standard of parade ground drill.

So vital was transportation that in 1814, when large numbers of British troops were sent to Canada, Sir George Prevost suggested converting all his Select Embodied Militia to boatmen and voyageurs. This plan met with disapproval from every Canadian officer. The Corps of Canadian Voyageurs are perpetuated in the Canadian Army by the Canadian Grenadier Guards.

=== Corps of Provincial Royal Artillery Drivers ===
Volunteers who served as drivers for units of the Royal Artillery. Its personnel may also have been paid for providing their own draught animals.

=== Dorchester Provincial Light Dragoons ===
A volunteer horsed unit perpetuated in the modern Canadian Army by Le Régiment de la Chaudière.

=== Frontier Light Infantry ===
A small unit, two companies strong, which were listed as the ninth and tenth companies of the Voltigeurs, but which were administered separately. Most of its men were English-speaking volunteers from the Eastern townships, unlike the French-speaking main body of the Voltigeurs. They operated alongside a group of Mohawk warriors at Lacolle, engaging in running firefights with the Americans during the latter's advance to the mill. The history and heritage of the Frontier Light Infantry is perpetuated within the Canadian Army by the Sherbrooke Hussars.

=== Quebec Volunteers ===
A small (50 men) volunteer unit, which may have been merged into the 6th Select Embodied Militia battalion.

=== Select Embodied Militia ===
Formed partly from volunteers, and partly from conscripted men chosen by lot, who served for one year only. (Late in the war, there was some trouble when Prevost refused to exempt men who had already served for a year from the ballot.) Four battalions were initially formed early in 1812, followed by a fifth after war was declared, and a sixth in 1813. The seventh and eighth battalions of Sedentary Embodied Militia were formed in Montreal in late 1813 when an American attack was threatened, but were disbanded as soon as the crisis was over.

When the Select Embodied Militia units were first formed, they were forced by a shortage of official pattern uniforms to adopt a variety of dress. Some elements of the 1st battalion served in the skirmish at Lacolle Mills in November 1812. By late 1813 at the latest, all battalions had been issued red uniforms.

The flank companies of the first to fourth battalions were detached to form (with detached light companies of British regular battalions) two ad hoc light infantry battalions during much of 1813. Part at least of the 1st Light Battalion under Lieutenant-Colonel George MacDonnell, which included the light company of the Canadian Fencibles and the light companies of the 2nd and 3rd battalions of Select Embodied Militia, and the main body of the 2nd Battalion of the Select Embodied Militia, also fought at the Battle of Châteauguay. The light battalions were broken up late in 1813 or in early 1814.

Except for the 6th battalion, which garrisoned the citadel of Quebec city, detachments of all the Select Embodied Militia units saw action in the Montreal or Lake Champlain sectors.

Perpetuation of battalions of the Select Embodied Militia within the Canadian Army is assigned to the following regiments:

- 1st Battalion: Le Régiment de la Chaudière
- 2nd Battalion: Canadian Grenadier Guards
- 3rd Battalion: not perpetuated
- 4th Battalion: Les Fusiliers du S^{t}-Laurent
- 5th Battalion: The Black Watch (Royal Highland Regiment) of Canada
- 6th Battalion: Les Voltigeurs de Québec
- 7th Battalion: Royal 22^{e} Régiment
- 8th Battalion: 12^{e} Régiment blindé du Canada

=== Royal Montreal Cavalry ===
A mounted unit of light cavalry located in Montreal. Raised in June 1812 by Captain George Platt as No. 1 Troop, Montreal Cavalry; later granted the title Royal by Governor General Sir George Prevost the same year. The volunteer unit served primarily as scouts, dispatch riders, and escorts along the Lower Canada border south of Montreal. The unit's service continued into the 1850's and is considered the antecedent unit to the Royal Canadian Hussars (Montreal).

The unit's uniform consisted of a standard 1812-pattern light dragoon uniform. Both officers and men were expected to provide their uniforms, horses and equipment at their own expense.

== Full-time Militia: Upper Canada ==
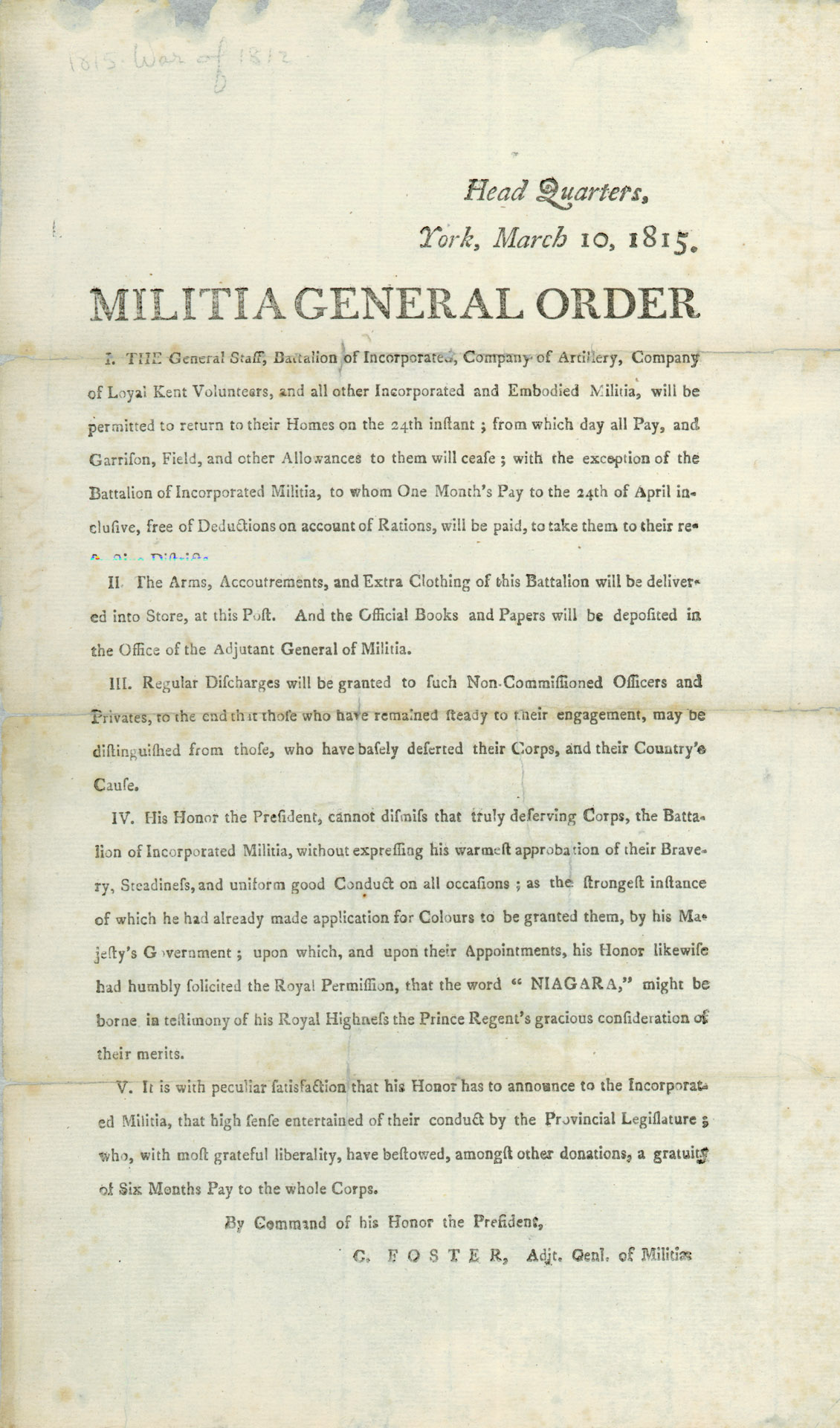
A militia general order issued from York demobilizing the full-time militia in Upper Canada after the end of the war, in March 1815

Most militia units in Upper Canada formed flank companies, who served on a more regular or full-time basis than the ordinary members of the militia, and were sometimes termed Volunteers. They drilled every weekend, as opposed to the bulk of the militia who were required to turn out for training only twice a year in peacetime. Such flank companies took part in the Battle of Queenston Heights and other actions on the Niagara peninsula.

=== Caldwell's Western Rangers ===
Known as Caldwell's Rangers, after their founder, noted Loyalist and Indian trader William Caldwell. The unit was a rather small one, probably not more than fifty men. Nominally organised as two companies, they often worked in conjunction with the British Indian Department and fought dispersed alongside the Indians (chiefly the Ojibwe, Wyandotte and Pottowottomi).

It is usually claimed that the Western Rangers were commanded by Caldwell, who had served during the Revolutionary War as a captain in Butler's Rangers, a British provincial regiment. There is evidence, however, that it was Caldwell's son, Captain William Caldwell, who led the Western Rangers. The Western Rangers were formed in mid-September 1813 from the militia participating in the withdrawal of British forces led by Major General Henry Procter from Amherstburg. They escaped capture when Procter was defeated by Major General William Henry Harrison at the Battle of the Thames in October 1813.

In March 1814, the Western Rangers saw action during an unsuccessful attempt by British forces to dislodge an American raiding party at the Battle of Longwoods. Caldwell again saw action at the Battle of Lundy's Lane in July 1814.

There is little authenticated documentation as to the clothing and equipment carried by the Rangers. It is known that the rangers were issued a "bucket cap" (probably a cut down infantry shako without the brass plate or hackle), grey woollen trousers and a green woollen tunic, and a black leather bayonet belt and cartridge box. This equipment was issued only once; after that, they were told to re-supply themselves from the enemy. In summer, they would wear white cotton instead of woollen trousers.

It is not known with which model musket they were issued, although some scholars have suggested that they would have been captured American Springfield Model 1795 Musket (British forces under Isaac Brock captured over 1200 Muskets and over 200 Rifles at Detroit) while some others contend they may have used trade muskets instead. The Rangers found that the standard infantry bayonet was too cumbersome for bush fighting and often used hatchets (tomahawks) instead.

The Rangers were recruited locally from Essex County and enrolled into the militia, but not permitted to quit the British service at their leisure as sedentary Militia could.

Fort Malden National Historic Site (Canada) has in recent years employed summer students for the re-created unit at the Park and regional re-enactments. There is also a Modern Re-enacting unit that recreates the Rangers; they are based out of Amherstburg, Ontario and work in conjunction with Fort Malden.

The Rangers are perpetuated in the modern Canadian Army by the Essex and Kent Scottish Regiment.

=== Corps of Provincial Artificers ===
Attached to the Royal Sappers and Miners. Some of its other ranks were Black individuals, many of whom had formed Captain Runchey's Company of Coloured Men (a local militia unit) at the Battle of Queenston Heights.

=== Incorporated Artillery Company ===
A volunteer artillery unit.

=== Incorporated Militia Battalion ===
The Incorporated Militia Battalion was formed from volunteers from the militia in 1813. Originally scattered in several garrisons, the battalion concentrated at York, before seeing action on the Niagara peninsula. The uniform of red coats had green facings, although uniforms were issued erratically and not all the companies would have had an official, recognized uniform. The entire unit fought at the Battle of Lundy's Lane where its commander, Lieutenant-Colonel William Robison (a captain in the 8th (King's) Regiment at the start of the war) was seriously wounded.

The unit was always used as a body of skirmishing light infantry, and late in 1814, Lieutenant-General Gordon Drummond proposed to give the battalion the same uniform as the Glengarry Light Infantry.

In the modern Canadian Army, because the Battalion of Incorporated Militia was recruited from various parts of Upper Canada, it is perpetuated today by four Ontario-based units: the Lincoln and Welland Regiment, the Queen's York Rangers, the Brockville Rifles and the Princess of Wales Own Regiment. These units all carry the Niagara battle honour awarded to the battalion in the aftermath of the war.

=== Loyal Essex Volunteers ===
A volunteer militia company, sometimes called the "Essex Rangers", embodied in Essex County about March 1814. This unit is perpetuated in the Canadian Army by the Essex and Kent Scottish Regiment.

=== Loyal Kent Volunteers ===
A company of volunteer militiamen formed in Kent county on 25 November 1813. Fought in the Skirmish at McCrae's House and the Battle of Longwoods. This unit is perpetuated in the Canadian Army by the Essex and Kent Scottish Regiment.

=== Mississippi Volunteers ===
An ad-hoc unit, recruited on the spot from voyageurs and traders during the attack on Prairie du Chien in 1814. There was also a Mississippi Volunteer Artillery detachment.

=== Incorporated Militia Artillery Company ===
Raised in June 1813, commanded by Captain Alexander Cameron. It consisted of four officers and 31 gunners.

=== Provincial Artillery Drivers ===
As in Lower Canada, volunteers who served as drivers for the Royal Artillery. The unit was organised as a troop, with five officers and 48 men. They and their draught animals were used to convert a detachment of Royal Artillery into a "car brigade", essentially horse artillery, under Captain W.H. Jackson. The detachment was stationed at Fort George and played a major part in the Battle of Queenston Heights. Two more such detachments were subsequently formed at Kingston.

Provincial Artillery Drivers are perpetuated in the Canadian Army by some reserve units such as the 10 Battery, 56th Field Artillery, RCA.

=== Provincial Dragoons ===
Also known as Merritt's troop, after its first commander, Captain William Hamilton Merritt. When raised in June 1813, it numbered two subalterns, one sergeant major, three sergeants, two corporals, one trumpeter and forty troopers, who were all who could afford to keep their own horses. Served on the Niagara peninsula. The Provincial Dragoons would later be seen as an ancestral unit of the 2nd/10th Dragoons, which currently exists today as 10th Field Battery, 56th Field Artillery Regiment, RCA in St. Catharines, Ontario.

== Part-time Militia: Lower Canada ==
The French-speaking population of Lower Canada had a long tradition of service in the militia. In 1812, Sir George Prevost disparagingly referred to the Lower Canada militia as "a mere posse, ill-arm'd and without discipline". However, one British medical officer (William "Tiger" Dunlop) commented on seeing several units turned out for duty in late 1813,

They had all a serviceable effective appearance - had been pretty well drilled, and their arms being direct from the tower, were in perfectly good order, nor had they the mobbish appearance that such a levy in any other country would have had. Their capotes and trowsers of home-spun stuff, and their blue tuques (night caps) were all of the same cut and color, which gave them an air of uniformity that added much to their military look, for I have always remarked that a body of men's appearance in battalion, depends much less on the fashion of their individual dress and appointments than on the whole being in strict uniformity. They marched merrily to the music of their voyageur songs as they perceived our [scarlet] uniform as we came up, they set up the Indian War-Whoop, followed by a shout of Vive le Roi along the whole line. Such a body of men in such a temper, and with so perfect a use of arms as all of them possessed, if posted on such ground as would preclude the possibility of regular troops out-manoeuvring them, and such positions are not hard to find in Canada, must have been rather a formidable body to have attacked.

Many militia had their own hunting weapons, and during the war, large numbers of British muskets were imported and issued to the militia.

In theory, 54,000 men were available for service with the militia. Each parish provided a militia company. These were organized for administrative purposes into "divisions", equivalent to regiments though of very variable size. These in turn were administered by the Districts of Montreal, Trois-Rivières and Quebec (although the Eastern Townships were largely independent of the Montreal district command).

Except in one or two units raised in the cities of Quebec and Montreal, militiamen and junior officers generally wore serviceable homespun clothing, perhaps with a gorget for officers. Field officers sometimes wore a variety of quasi-military uniforms.

Two companies from Beauharnois were heavily engaged at the Battle of Châteauguay.

== Part-time Militia: Upper Canada ==
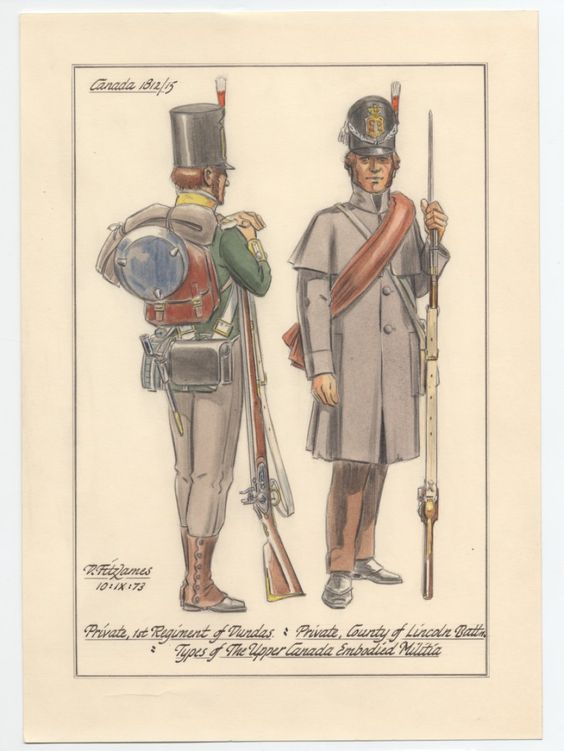
Privates of the Dundas and Lincoln County militia

In Upper Canada, several parts of which were attacked or occupied by American forces during the war, there were conflicting demands on the militia. On the one hand they were required for military duty; on the other, they were urgently needed to grow and harvest crops. This hampered most attempts to organise their efforts consistently.

The Upper Canadian militia were organised into Regiments, based on the "ridings" of each County, such as the 1st and 2nd Essex Militia based out of Essex County, Ontario. Normally in Upper Canada, militia units would meet once a year to receive minor military training. They would wear their own clothing and many armed themselves with their own weapons. At the instigation of Major-General Isaac Brock, commanding in Upper Canada, each regiment formed two "flank companies" consisting of one captain, two subalterns, two sergeants, one drummer and thirty-five men, who were prepared to train six times per month. They were not paid, but were exempt from Jury duty or service as any town or parish officer, or statutory duty to construct or maintain highways, or arrest in any civil case.

Early in the war, many officials feared disaffection among the population of Upper Canada, many of whom were recent immigrants from the United States. In the event, Brock did much to rally public morale by his victory at Detroit.

=== Leeds, Stormont, Dundas, Glengarry ===
The militia from the districts along the Saint Lawrence were never so troubled with disaffection as those further west, and took part in several raids and counter-raids over the winter of 1812–13. Temporarily reinforced with regulars, many participated in the Battle of Ogdensburg. (Some of the Leeds Militia sported captured American Rifle Regiment uniforms for the remainder of the war.)

Late in 1813, the Americans under James Wilkinson descended the Saint Lawrence to attack Montreal. The Dundas County Militia harassed the American boats. 500 militia from Stormont and Glengarry were defeated at Hoople's Creek by 1500 Americans under Jacob Brown, but Wilkinson abandoned the campaign shortly afterwards.

Other than this episode, the militia along the Saint Lawrence were little troubled during the remainder of the war.

=== Niagara and York ===
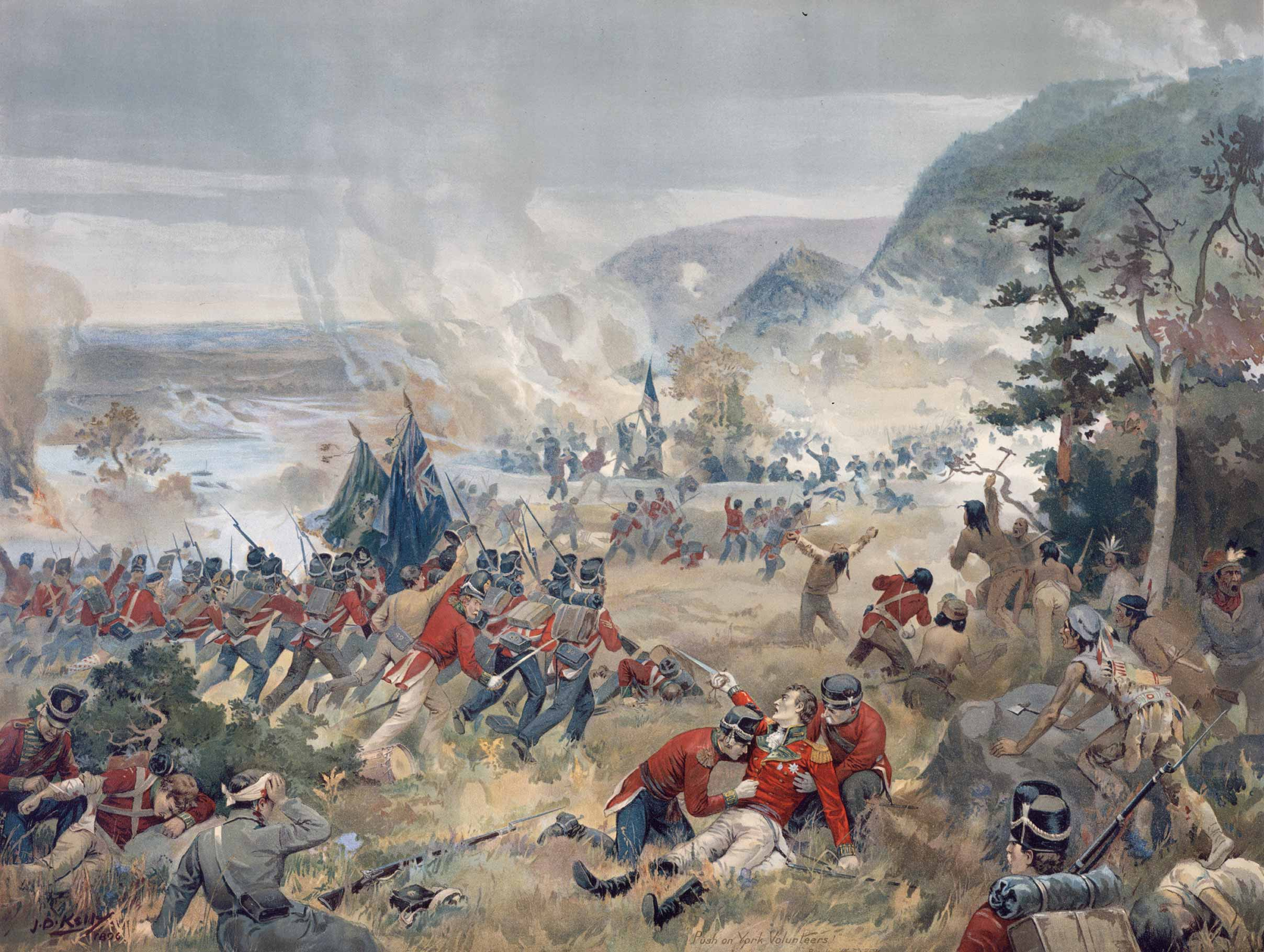
A depiction of the mortally wounded Issac Brock urging the 2nd Regiment of York Militia forward during the Battle of Queenston Heights.

A substantial contingent of Brock's force at Detroit consisted of volunteers from the York Militia (the "York Volunteers"), who also took part together with large numbers of Lincoln Militia in the Battle of Queenston Heights.

In several battles in 1813, British regulars were forced to retreat and leave the local militia either to disband (as at the Battle of Fort George) or make the best terms they could with the Americans (as at the Battle of York). These defeats did little to improve relations between the Canadians and some British officers. Nevertheless, militia from Lincoln County and other districts along the Niagara River continued to turn out for duty for the remainder of the war.

In 1814, up to 500 members of the local (Lincoln) and York sedentary militia took part in the Battle of Lundy's Lane. Two years of warfare had not improved their military prowess. After some confused firing, most were sent away after their ammunition was redistributed among the regulars. One of their men was killed and twenty-one injured.

John Button's Troop from Buttonville in present-day Markham, Ontario was formed in 1810 as 1st York Light Dragoons (also referred to as Troop of Markham Dragoons or Captain Button's Dragoons). A troop of 50 men provided their own horses and tack, by 1813 they were issued blue short jackets and grey trousers and served as part of the 3rd York Militia. Some were present as infantry at the capture of Detroit, one dying of unknown causes soon afterwards. The troop was issued swords and pistols and were called out as part of the "Stationary Express' (likely a double entendre), running dispatches throughout the war between York and Kingston. A daguerreotype of Major John Button in the 1850s (in the Governor General's Horse Guards Collection) shows the octagenarian wearing a blue jacket and plumed top-hat, clutching a 1796 pattern sabre. The troop was uniformed and mounted on the dedication of the colours parade for the Incorporated Militia of Upper Canada on St George's Day 1822. They also turned out, mounted, uniformed and armed in support of the Crown during the Rebellion of 1836. Button's Troop is today perpetuated by the modern day armoured reconnaissance regiment the Governor General's Horse Guards in Toronto.

=== Western districts ===
During the initial stages of the war, Major-General Isaac Brock moblized contingents of Upper Canada militia, including Essex, Kent, Norfolk, Middlesex, and Oxford from the western districts, to bolster his forces in the face of a large American invasion force being assembled in the Michigan territory under the command of Brigadier-General William Hull. Though outnumbered, this combined force of regulars and militia was successful in capturing Detroit in August 1812. A portion of the Prize Pay List for the 2nd Regiment of Essex Militia from this capture presently hangs in the Tilston Armoury, Windsor. Elements of the Essex militia were also actively engaged at the Battle of Frenchtown in January 1813 and at the Siege of Fort Meigs in May 1813.

Late in 1813, following the Battle of Lake Erie, the Americans recaptured Detroit, captured Amherstburg and defeated the retreating British army under Major-General Henry Procter at the Battle of the Thames. A detachment from the Norfolk and Oxford Militias fought at the Battle of Nanticoke Creek. A detachment of men from the Norfolk and Middlesex Militias fought at the Skirmish at McCrae's House. From then until the end of the war, only small outposts of British regulars were stationed in the Western Districts of Kent, Essex and Norfolk. During 1814, American troops made several raids from Detroit or Lake Erie against these, causing much destruction. The local militia could not stop a determined expedition (for example, that which resulted in the Battle of Malcolm's Mills), but could stop small scale nuisance raids. The Essex and Kent militias are perpetuated in the Canadian Army by the Essex and Kent Scottish Regiment.
