= John Wilson (Ontario politician, born 1807) =

Canadian politician

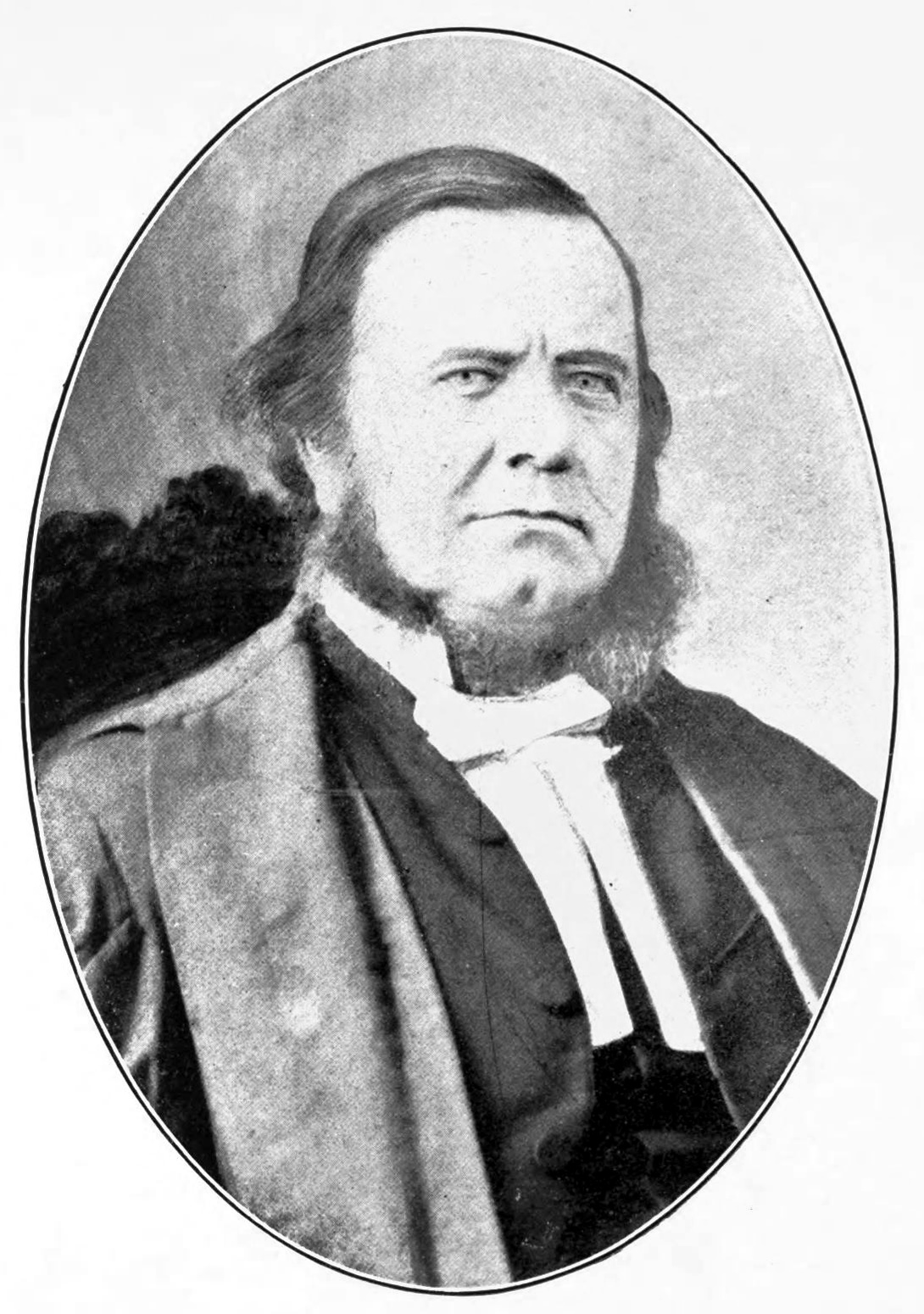
Wilson in an undated photograph

John Wilson, QC (February 5, 1807 – June 3, 1869) was an Ontario lawyer, judge and political figure. He shot and killed Robert Lyon in what is believed to have been the last duel fought in Ontario and the last fatal duel in Canada.

He was born in Paisley, Renfrewshire, Scotland in 1807 and settled in Perth, Upper Canada with his family around 1823. He studied law in Perth. The duel was fought on June 13, 1833, over comments that Lyon, another law student, had made against the character of a Miss Elizabeth Hughes (who Wilson later married).

Wilson and his second were charged with murder but acquitted. He was called to the Upper Canada bar in 1835, joined Boulton's practice at Niagara and later set up his own practice at London. He helped organize local resistance against the Upper Canada Rebellion and was a Captain in the London Home Guard in 1838. Wilson served as warden for the London District from 1842 to 1844 and also served as solicitor for the city of London. He was elected to the Legislative Assembly of the Province of Canada in an 1847 by-election as a Conservative and then was reelected in 1848 and 1854.

In 1856, Wilson was named Queen's Counsel. He was elected to the Legislative Council for St. Clair division in 1863 but was named judge in the Court of Common Pleas a few months later. He sentenced seven Fenians captured during the Fenian raids to death, but these sentences were commuted.

== Death ==
Wilson died in Westminster Township, Ontario in 1869, aged 62.

Preceded by Levius Peters Sherwood	Speaker of the Legislative Assembly of Upper Canada; 1825–1828	Succeeded by Marshall Spring Bidwell
