= Middlesex Militia (Upper Canada) =

- Active: c.1800 – 1866
- Country: Upper Canada
- Allegiance: Great Britain
- Branch: Canadian Militia
- Type: Militia
- Size: Regiment
- Engagements: War of 1812: Siege of Detroit; Skirmish at McCrae's House; Battle of Lundy's Lane; Battle of Malcolm's Mills; Rebellions of 1837–1838: Duncombe Rebellion; Capture of the Anne; Fenian Raids: St. Clair Border

Commanders
- Notable commanders: Col. Hon. Thomas Talbot; Lt-Col. Mahlon Burwell

The Middlesex County Militia, also commonly known as the Middlesex Militia, was a regiment of the provincial militia of Upper Canada that was raised in Middlesex County, Ontario, in the early 1800s. The Middlesex Militia is currently perpetuated by the 4th Battalion, Royal Canadian Regiment.

== Early days ==
Middlesex County was originally organized as Suffolk County in 1792 by Governor Simcoe. In 1793, he renamed the county Middlesex and created the settlement of London, intending for the new capital of Upper Canada to be located there. It became part of the London District in 1798.

Around 1800, the first militia units were raised in Middlesex County, but by 1808 it was still unorganized as a coherent county unit.

== War of 1812 ==
During the War of 1812, the 1st Middlesex Militia was commanded by Col. Talbot and served along the Western and Niagara frontiers from 1812 to 1814.

The 1st Middlesex Militia was composed of the following companies and officers (with dates of commission):

Headquarters

- Col. Hon. Thomas Talbot - 12 Feb., 1812
- Lt.-Col. Mahlon Burwell - 13 Feb., 1812
- Maj. John Eakins
- Adj. John Potts
- Adj. James Nevill - 25 March 1814
- Qrtmstr. Sylvanus Reynolds - 29 Dec., 1812

1st Flank Company

- Capt. David Secord - 12 Feb., 1812
- Lt. William Saxton - 13 Feb., 1812
- Ens. Benjamin Wilson

2nd Flank Company

- Capt. Daniel Springer - 13 Feb., 1812
- L.t William Bird - 12 Feb., 1812
- Ens. Joseph Defields - 14 Feb., 1812

1st Battalion Company

- Capt. Gilman Wilson - 14 Feb., 1812
- Lt. Moses Rice
- Ens. Daniel Mclntyre - 12 Feb., 1812

2nd Battalion Company

- Capt. Leslie Patterson - 15 Feb., 1812
- Lt. Gideon Tiffany - 14 Feb., 1812
- Ens. David Davis, 13 Feb., 1812

3rd Battalion Company

- Capt. Samuel Edison - 16 Feb., 1812 (grandfather of Thomas Edison)
- Lt. Samuel Axford
- Ens. Samuel Harris - 17 Feb., 1812

Elements of the 1st Flank Company were attached to the 1st Norfolk Militia and served at the Siege of Detroit including Ensign Benjamin Wilson who was awarded the Military General Service Medal. Detachments from the 1st Flank Company and the 1st Battalion Company fought at the Skirmish at McCrae's House in December 1813 under the command of Lt. Moses Rice and Ens. Benjamin Wilson.

The Battle of Lundy's Lane, which the regiment fought in

Detachments from all companies of the 1st Middlesex fought at the Battle of Lundy's Lane on July 25, 1814. The regiment formed part of the 2nd Militia Brigade under Lt-Col. Christopher Hamilton, which served in Col. Hercules Scott's force. The force advanced from Twelve Mile Creek and halted early on the morning of July 25 at Shipman's Corners. Around 1:00 p.m., the force received orders to rendezvous with Col. Brown at Lundy’s Lane, and they advanced to the battlefield, joining the engagement that afternoon. Two privates from the 1st Middlesex were wounded in the battle.

The majority of the whole regiment fought at the Battle of Malcolm's Mills on November 6, 1814, under the command of Maj. John Eakins. The 1st Middlesex suffered one private killed during the battle. It was the last land battle fought in Upper Canada during the war.

On November 24, 1813, the Loyal London Volunteers was formed as an independent militia company operating in the London area. They would serve against the American raids in 1814.

Casualties of the 1st Middlesex Militia
Soldier	Casualty	Action
Sgt. Allanson B. Pease	Died of disease	(Jan. 1, 1814)
Capt. Daniel Springer	Prisoner of War	Raid on Middlesex (Feb. 2, 1814)
Pte. James Vail	Died from drowning	Fort Wellington (1814)
Capt. Leslie Patterson	Prisoner of War	Norfolk Raids (May 30, 1814)
Capt. Gilman Wilson	Prisoner of War	Norfolk Raids (May 30, 1814)
Pte. Robert Burwell	Wounded in action	Lundy's Lane (Jul. 25, 1814)
Pte. Nathan Baldwin	Wounded in action	Lundy's Lane (Jul. 25, 1814)
Pte. Moses Brigham	Died of disease	(Aug. 6, 1814)
Pte. Edwin Barton	Killed in action	Malcolm's Mills (Nov. 6, 1814)
Lt-Col. Mahlon Burwell	Prisoner of War	Raid on Middlesex (Nov. 30, 1814)
Sgt. Benjamin Schram	Wounded	Skirmish near Westminster (1814)
Pte. Elisha Benedict	Went insane	

Deserters from the 1st Middlesex Militia
John Armstrong	John Axford	Joseph Decew
John Gregory		

== Reorganization of the Militia ==
On June 18, 1822, a Militia General Order was issued from York reorganizing the Upper Canada militia regiments. This order divided the 1st Middlesex Regiment of Militia into four regiments or battalions. The four regiments were:

- 1st Middlesex Regiment - commanded by Col. Thomas Talbot
- 2nd Middlesex Regiment - commanded by Lieut. Colonel Mahlon Burwell
- 3rd Middlesex Regiment - commanded by Lieut. Col. John Bostwick, from the 1st Norfolk Militia
- 4th Middlesex Regiment - commanded by Lieut. Col. James Hamilton

In 1830 the regiments of Middlesex militia were composed of the following officers:

1st Middlesex

- Colonel - Thomas Talbot
- Captains - Gilman Wilson, Leslie Patterson, John Matthews, James McQueen, John Warren, Archibald Gillis, Hugh McCowan, James McKinley
- Lieutenants - Wm. Bird, Gideon Tiffany, Thos. McCall, Samuel McCall, John G. Gillies, Duncan Mackenzie, J. M. Farland (Adjutant)
- Ensigns - Daniel McIntyre, David Davis, Samuel Harris
- Quartermaster - Sylvanus Reynolds

2nd Middlesex

- Colonel - Mahlon Burwell
- Lieutenant-Colonel - John Backhouse
- Major - John Rolph
- Captains - Samuel Edison, Wm. Saxton, Joseph Defield, Abe. Backhouse, Titus Williams, Isaac Draper, Andrew Dobie, Henry Backhouse, William Summers
- Lieutenants - Gilbert Wrong, John Summers, James Hutchinson, James Bell, Henry House, James Summers, Alex. Saxton
- Ensigns - George Dobie, Alexander Summers, John Benner, John E. Kennedy, Win. McIntosh, Peter Defield, Thomas Edison jr.
- Quartermaster - Reuben Kennedy

3rd Middlesex

- Colonel - John Bostwick
- Captains - Benjamin Wilson, James Nevilles, John Conrad and Joseph Smith, Joseph L. O'Dell, Josiah C. Goodhue, Joseph House, Michael McLoughlin
- Lieutenants - Wm. Orr and Jesse Gantz, John Merlatt, Joshua Putnam, James Weishuln, Joshua S. O'Dell, William P. Leard, Gardner Merrick
- Ensigns - Jonas Barnes, John T. Doan, Silas E. Curtis, Nathaniel Griffiths, Lawrence Dingman, Samuel Summer

4th Middlesex

- Colonel - James Hamilton
- Major - Ira Schofield
- Captains - Joseph Harrison, Simon Bullen, Roswell Mount, Duncan Mackenzie, Richard Talbot, Daniel Hine, Edward E Warren, Thomas Lawrason, Daniel Doty, Edward E. Talbot, Wm. Putnam, John Ewart
- Lieutenants - James Fisher, John Siddall, John T. Jones, Wm. Gray, Alex. Sinclair, John Brain, Arch. McFarlane, Robert Webster, Nathaniel Jacobs
- Ensigns - Henry B Warren, Lawrence Lawrason, Daniel Campbell, Thomas H. Sumner, George Robson, Wm. Burgess, Philip Harding, James Parkinson, John Talbot, jr.
- Quartermaster - William Putnam

By 1837, the militia had again been reorganized, with the battalions correlating to the county townships:

- 1st Middlesex (Dunwich, Southwold and Aldborough) Regiment - Col. T. Talbot
- 2nd Middlesex (Malahide and Bayham) Regiment - Col. M. Burwell
- 3rd Middlesex (Yarmouth, Westminster, Dorchester and Delaware) Regiment - Col. J. Bostwick
- 4th Middlesex (Lobo, London and North Dorchester) Regiment - Lt-Col. T.H. Ball
- 5th Middlesex (Caradoc, Ekfrid and Mosa) Regiment - Col. S. Craig
- 2nd Middlesex (Adelaide) Light Infantry - Col. T Radcliff

== Rebellion of 1837-38 ==
In 1837, London was selected as a military station, with the 32nd Regiment of Foot being the first to garrison the city, while the 85th Regiment of Foot occupied St Thomas and Sandwich.

With the outbreak of the Rebellions of 1837-1838, the Middlesex Militia was placed on active duty in the county and was tasked with apprehending rebels from the area who were gathering under the command of Charles Duncombe. Men from Norfolk, Oxford, and Middlesex flocked to join the rebel militia that was gathering near Middlesex. With the advance of the Oxford and Middlesex militias, the rebels quickly dispersed before an engagement could occur. John Kinder Labatt served as a private in the 3rd Middlesex in 1837, stationed on guard at St. Thomas. Thomas Carling served as a private in the London Troop of Cavalry attached to the 4th Middlsex from 1837-39.

A battalion of four companies was formed in London in 1837 to serve as a Home Guard. The men were enlisted for 18 months service but due to the end of the rebellion in 1838 they were discharged early. Col. T.H. Ball from the 4th Middlesex Regiment was placed in command of the London Home Guard Battalion with the following officers:

- Capts. John Wilson and William McMillan
- Lts. H.R.C. Becher and John Jennings
- Ens. Sterne Ball and Thomas Ball
- Adj. Ross Robertson
- Surg. Dr. McKenzie
- Qrtrmstr. Freeman Talbot

Elements of the Middlesex Militia served at Fort Malden during the rebellion and on January 9, 1838, a force of 60 rebels sailed from the United States and landed on Bois Blanc Island. The schooner Anne, supporting the rebel attack, sailed alongside the mainland firing on positions at Fort Malden. The 2nd Middlesex Light Infantry, under Col. Thomas Radcliff, and other local regiments returned fire, disabling the helmsman and damaging the rigging. The Anne grounded on Elliott's Point and the rebels were captured by Radcliff's men.

== Fenian Raids ==
A Militia General Order issued from Quebec on July 12, 1855, placed Middlesex County into Militia District No. 8, along with Elgin, Oxford, Norfolk, Brant and London. The headquarters for the militia district were in London.

The volunteer militia companies raised in the City of London during this time were:

- London Volunteer Troop of Cavalry - raised in 1854
- London Field Battery of Artillery - raised in 1856
- 2nd Volunteer Militia Rifle Company of London (*) - raised on 20 March 1856
- The London Highland Volunteer Rifle Company (*) - raised on 7 August 1856
- Volunteer Militia Foot Artillery Company of London (*) - raised on 22 January 1862
- The Merchants Volunteer Rifle Company of London (*) - raised on 26 December 1862
- 2nd London Infantry Company (*) - raised on 23 January 1863
- London Volunteer Rifle Company (*)- raised on 24 March 1865

Companies marked with an (*) would amalgamate to form the 7th London Fusiliers on 27 April 1866.

The volunteer militia companies raised in the surrounding Middlesex County during this time were:

- Komoka Rifle Company - raised 17 July 1861
- Thamesford Infantry Company - raised 11 September 1862
- Lucan Infantry Company - raised 19 December 1862
- Wardsville Infantry Company - raised 2 January 1863
- Delaware Infantry Company - raised 30 Jan. 1863
- Harriettsville Infantry Company - raised 6 February 1863
- Strathroy Infantry Company - raised 8 June 1866

They would amalgamate to form the 26th Middlesex Light Infantry on 14 September 1866.

In 1865, the sedentary Middlesex Militia was composed of eight battalions, corresponding to the townships within the county, while London had two battalions of militia. The following were the officers of the Middlesex and London Militia:

- 1st Middlesex Battalion - Lt-Col. William McMillan
- 2nd Middlesex Battalion - Lt-Col. William E. Niles
- 3rd Middlesex Battalion - Lt-Col. William Orr
- 4th Middlesex Battalion - Lt-Col. Benjamin Springer
- 5th Middlesex Battalion - Lt-Col. William M. Johnson
- 6th Middlesex Battalion - Lt-Col. John Arthurs
- 7th Middlesex Battalion - Lt-Col. Richard Irwin
- 8th Middlesex Battalion - Lt-Col. John Scatcherd
- 1st London Militia - Lt-Col. Lawrence Lawrason
- 2nd London Militia - Lt-Col. John Wilson

The establishment of the two Middlesex area regiments in 1866 led to the essential disbanding of the sedentary county militia. Both regiments would serve on active duty during the Fenian Raids and many veterans would receive the Canada General Service Medal.

Eligible men for the Middlesex Militia, 1867
Township	Number of Men
Adelaide	512
Biddulph	636
Delaware	281
North Dorchester	598
Ekfrid	513
London	1,470
Metcalfe	427
Caradoc	776
Nissouri West	604
Srathroy	307
Williams East	526
Williams West	200
Mosa	614
Lobo	552
Westminster	1,031
McGillivray	712
County Total	9,759

== Perpetuation ==
Through the lineage of the 7th London Fusiliers, the Middlesex Militia is currently perpetuated by the 4th Battalion, Royal Canadian Regiment, and the regiment bears the War of 1812 battle honours won by the Middlesex Militia:

- Defence of Canada – 1812–1815 – Défense du Canada
- Detroit
- Niagara

== See also ==
- Canadian units of the War of 1812
