= Chris Doty =

Canadian historian and journalist (1966–2006)

Chris Bourke Doty (September 8, 1966 – February 2, 2006) was a Canadian journalist, historian, award-winning documentary filmmaker, author and playwright, noted for his many contributions to the cultural life of his hometown of London, Ontario.

A graduate of Tecumseh Public School, London South Collegiate Institute and the journalism school at the University of Western Ontario in 1991, Doty grew up on tree-lined Lyndhurst Place in old south London, where he was a paper boy for The London Free Press during his formative years.

== Historical documentary films and plays ==
His writing included numerous articles in local and area publications such as The London Free Press, the Simcoe Reformer, the Strathroy Age-Dispatch and the UWO Gazette, as well as a book on hangings in London and Ontario.

His documentary films have covered such subjects as:

- Old Theatres: The Return, 1991 (while still a student at UWO)
- Marc Emery: Messing Up the System, 1992
- Slippery the Seal and Storybook Gardens in London (Slippery, 1995)
- London's great flood of 1937 (Lost April: The Flood of '37, 1997)
- the history of London (Vagabonds and Visionaries: The London Story, 1998)
- CBC-TV's Guy Lombardo: When We Danced, 1998
- a Guelph, Ontario, promotional video (Guelph: City of Opportunity, 2000)
- the British Royal visit of 1939 (A Great Day for London: The Royal Visit of 1939, 2000)
- the history of the Grand Theatre, (Let's Go to the Grand!, 2001)
- the history of the local TV station (Rewind: Fifty Years of Local Television), 2003)
- the first 40 years of the London Knights hockey team (Green and Gold: 40 Seasons of the London Knights, 2005)
- The Jack Chambers Film Project, 2005

Doty's historical documentary films earned his film company, Doty Docs, a total of six provincial and national awards.

He also wrote the commemorative book, Fifty Years of Music: The Story of EMI Music Canada, 1999, and was active in film restoration, bringing forgotten Canadian films and documentaries back to the public's attention. These have included Here Will I Nest, 1942, The Turkey Point Witch Project, 1962, and Guy Lombardo: A Royal Canadian, 1977.

Doty restored the only known print of Canada's first feature-length colour movie, Here Will I Nest and produced a series of historical minutes/ videos for The New PL TV-station (now the A-Channel, originally CFPL-TV), Rogers Television the City of London, Museum London and the Banting House Museum.

In 2003, Doty was instrumental in convincing the city to name a park in honour of London-born black actor Richard B. Harrison (1864–1935), in south-central London, as well as having an interpretive historical plaque erected in Richard B. Harrison Park.

Doty was also involved in local theatre as a playwright and a producer, including a dramatized recreation of The Donnelly Trial—the 1880 trial of alleged ringleader James Carroll for the mob killing of the notorious Black Donnellys of Biddulph Township north of London near Lucan, Ontario, on February 4, 1880—in the same courtroom in London's historic courthouse (now the Middlesex County building) where the trial occurred 126 years ago. The play had two possible endings that a jury, made up of 12 audience members, could determine depending on their verdict.

During Doors Open London, 2005, Doty played a key role in writing the scripts for the Lost Soul Stroll street theatre in downtown London whose theme was London's past, ghosts and hauntings.

The second play that Doty co-wrote and produced was about political-marijuana activist, Marc Emery, called Citizen Marc, The Adventures of Marc Emery.

In addition, Doty co-founded the Brickenden Awards in 2002 to recognize excellence in theatre in London, which Doty last attended on Monday, January 30, 2006, with The Donnelly Trial winning a Brickenden for the "Ballyhoo Award" (best advance promotion) and also one for best costumes (made by Barbara Hunter).

== Death ==
The date of Doty's death is believed to be February 2, 2006, although his body was not discovered until a day later on February 3, 2006 in his home on Trevithen Street in south London — twenty-four hours before the final performance of Citizen Marc, which was playing downtown at the London Arts Project on Dundas Street. Doty's funeral home visitation at Donahue Funeral Home on February 6 and funeral service at Metropolitan United Church in London on February 7, 2006, were both attended by several hundred mourners, including members of London's media, arts-and-heritage communities. In June 2006, The Donnelly Trial was reprised by producer Grant Doty, Chris' younger brother, at the Old Middlesex County courthouse in memory of Chris Doty.

== Legacy ==
Late in 2006, the London Arts Council established the Chris Doty Endowment Fund, a yearly cash award to be given to a local artist whose work involves local history.
