= Skirmish at McCrae's House =

Small skirmish fought as a part of the War of 1812 in Canada

Coordinates: 42°22′56″N 82°14′58″W

- Part of War of 1812
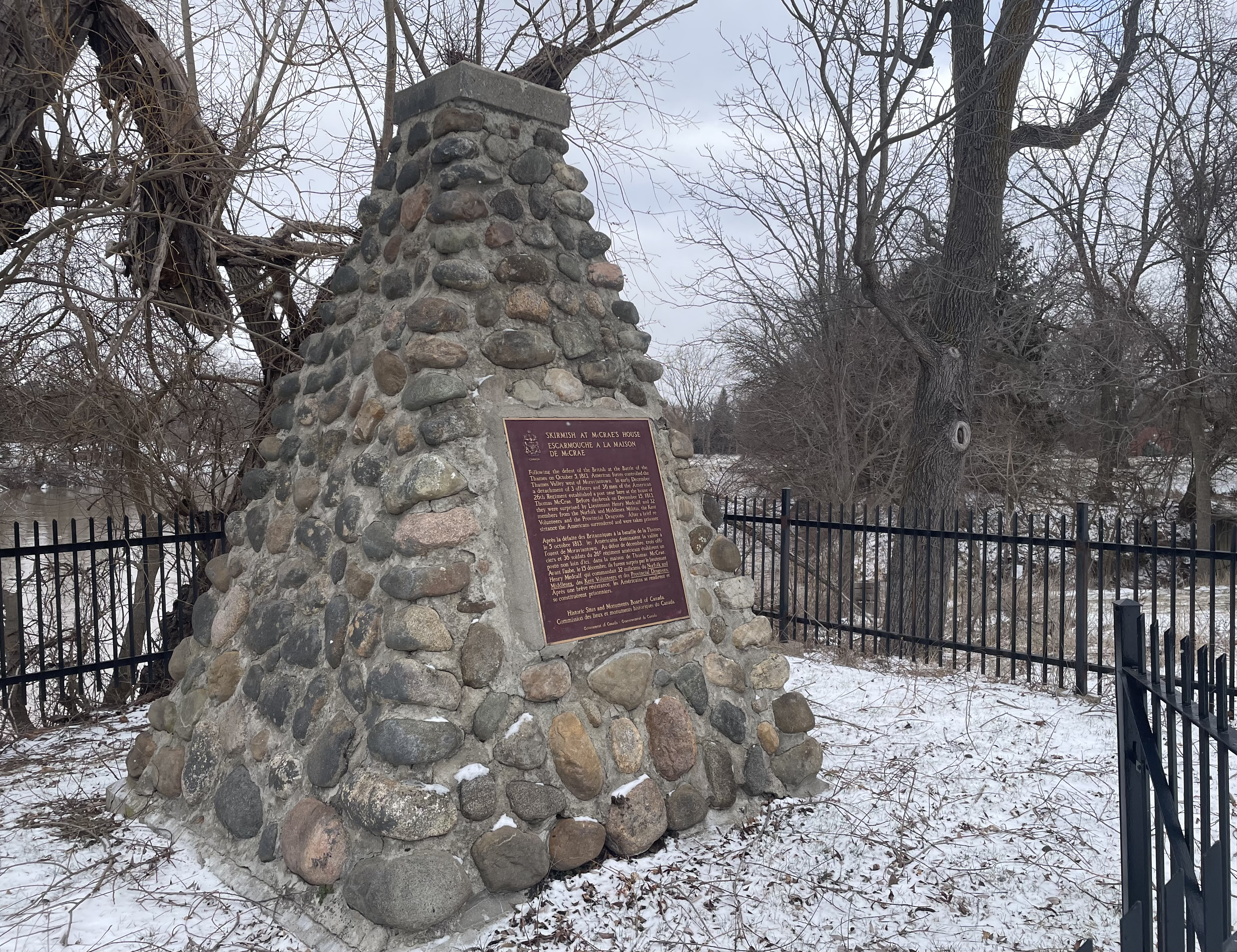
- Commemorative Cairn erected near the McCrae House
Date	December 15, 1813
Location	Chatham, Ontario, Canada
Result	British victory

Belligerents
United Kingdom; Upper Canada	United States

Commanders and leaders
Henry Medcalf; John McGregor	Larwill (surrendered)

Units involved
Loyal Kent Volunteers; Provincial Dragoons; Middlesex Militia; 2nd Norfolk Militia	26th U.S. Infantry Regiment

Strength
33	39

Casualties and losses
None	1 killed 5 wounded 38 captured

The Skirmish at McCrae's House was a small engagement fought on December 15, 1813, during the War of 1812 near Chatham, Ontario, Canada.

== Background ==
Following the Battle of the Thames in October, American forces occupied most of south-western Ontario, establishing a line of outposts in the counties of Essex, Kent, Oxford, Middlesex, and Norfolk. The local militia conducted small skirmishes and raids against various outposts.

== Skirmish ==
Early on the morning of December 15, 1813, a mixed group of men from the Loyal Kent Volunteers, Provincial Dragoons, Middlesex Militia, and Norfolk Militia scaled the icy banks of the Thames River to advance on a group of soldiers from the 26th U.S. Infantry who had taken up a post in the house of Thomas McCrae, a Captain in the 1st Kent Militia. They surprised and attacked the Americans, firing through the windows and door of the house.

The skirmish was brief but fierce, and damage can still be seen on the bricks walls of the house today.

== Order of Battle ==
Canadian forces

- 2nd Norfolk Militia – Lt. Henry Medcalf (10 men)
- Middlesex Militia – Lt. Moses Rice, Ens. Benjamin Wilson (10 men)
- Loyal Kent Volunteers – Lt. John McGregor, Ens. James McGregor (7 men)
- Provincial Dragoons (5 men)

American forces

- 26th U.S. Infantry Regiment – Lt. Larwill (39 officers and men)

== Aftermath ==
The skirmish resulted in one American soldier killed and five wounded, the remainder surrendering to the Canadian Militia. The fallen American soldier was buried in a grave on the property on December 16. Their guns were distributed amongst the militiamen and they were taken prisoner.

The skirmish marks the only time that an American regular force was defeated and captured solely by Canadian Militia.

=== Legacy ===
For his conduct in commanding the attack, Lt. Medcalf was promoted to Captain in the 2nd Norfolk Militia on January 21, 1814.

For his gallant conduct during the skirmish, Pte. James McQueen of the 2nd Norfolk Militia was commissioned as an officer in that regiment.

Ensign Benjamin Wilson of the 1st Middlesex Militia was mentioned in dispatches by Lt. Medcalf for his gallant service at the skirmish.

To commemorate the skirmish, a stone cairn with a plaque was built in 1924 near the McCrae House in Raleigh Township. The plaque details the skirmish.
