= Lewis Burwell (Upper Canada) =

- Born: 1793/1794; Niagara, Ontario
- Died: 1865 (aged 71); Brantford, Ontario
- Occupation: surveyor

Lewis Burwell (1793/1794 – 1865) was a surveyor in Upper Canada, like his more famous brother Mahlon Burwell.

In 1818 Lewis Burwell assisted his older brother Mahlon in surveying London, Ontario.

In 1832 Burwell was the Deputy Provincial Land Surveyor of Upper Canada.

On November 17, 1834, a letter detailing how a dispute between Burwell, and another surveyor, had caused difficulties in the Township of Norwich, was entered into the record of Upper Canada's Parliament.

Following the Rebellion of 1837 Burwell was a witness against George Alexander Clark, a Brantford merchant. Burwell testified that, while the militia was assembling, Clark called for militia members to go home, claimed their officer had no authority to muster them, claimed it was the Provincial government that was at fault.
