= Talbot Creek =

Coordinates: 42°38′21″N 81°21′15″W

Talbot Creek is a watercourse in Elgin County, Ontario, Canada, that drains into Lake Erie. It was first settled in 1803.
