= Port Talbot, Ontario =

Coordinates: 42.640147°N 81.356936°W

Port Talbot was the name of a community located west of Port Stanley, about one hour's drive south from London, Ontario, Canada, where Talbot Creek flows into Lake Erie. The village was the original commercial nucleus for the settlement which developed on 5,000 acres (20 km^{2}) of land granted to Thomas Talbot in 1800 by the Crown along the northwestern shore of Lake Erie. The settlement was one of the most prosperous of its time in Upper Canada, noted for its good roads, with Talbot keeping out land speculators and securing hard-working settlers. Talbot's authoritarian control of the settlers led to conflicts with the Executive Council of Upper Canada and a reduction in his powers.

As a result of invading American forces during the War of 1812, the community was burned in 1814 in a series of raids and was never rebuilt.

The site was designated a National Historic Site of Canada in 1923.

== History ==
Thomas Talbot had served under Lieutenant Governor, John Graves Simcoe, as personal secretary in 1793. On Talbot's behalf, Simcoe requested 2,000 hectares of land along the coastline of Lake Erie for the benefit of creating a settlement. Talbot returned to Canada from England and in 1803, landed at the spot that would become Port Talbot, and established the settlement that would be his home for the remainder of his life. Two years earlier, he had attempted to secure a settlement at either Kettle Creek (now Port Stanley) or Catfish Creek but his land grant was detained which prevented his ability to settle in such an area. Upon his arrival in Port Talbot, he is reported to have remarked "Here will I roost and will soon make the forest tremble under the wings of the flock I will invite by my warblings around me!"

Before long, he had erected a functional log house on a hill facing the lake and with a view of the valley of Talbot Creek. At his own expense, he built the first water mill in the settlement at Talbot Creek and had it functioning by 1808. He provided the settlers to his community with seed for wheat, barley, peas and oats. In addition to the standard grains, the settlers planted Indian corn.

Talbot was adept at finding individuals who had skill in infrastructure development. Roads were added to the new settlement by John Bostwick, starting with the Talbot Road in 1804. Bostwick was the son of the Reverend Gideon Bostwick, rector of Barrington of Massachusetts. John was not a novice to road surveying, having apprenticed under the surveyor who had laid out Aldborough Township. Later, John held the offices of high constable and sheriff of the London office and was the son-in-law of Joseph Ryerson. James Witton was contracted to build log houses and Mahlon Burwell constructed a bridge over Talbot Creek.

== War of 1812 ==
Intending to protect his settlers, Talbot, deputized by Colonel Brock in 1812 and given charge of the Middlesex militia, built a fort to protect against invasion via Lake Erie on Mount Pisgah, and another that was more land-based. During the War of 1812, several former settlers of Talbot's settlement had defected to the American side. These men included Andrew Westbrook, Simon Zelotes Watson, Daniel Norton, Samuel Doyle, and James Pelton; of these, Westbrook and Watson were the most venomous in their contempt for Talbot. Watson had had interest in becoming a partner with Talbot who rejected him out of hand. Craving vengeance against his strict control over the settlers, they wanted to capture Talbot and take him prisoner. In 1814, they conducted several raids across Lake Erie, attacking Port Dover and other locations. As part of a rampage of destruction, on May 19, 1814, a small raiding party under the command of U.S. Colonel John B. Campbell attacked Port Talbot with the intent to destroy the port. Five days earlier, the team under Campbell had attacked Port Dover, burning several flour mills, saw mills, distilleries and a significant number of houses, of which senior U.S. officers were disgusted and the U.S. government later disavowed knowledge. Other raids on Port Talbot were conducted in July, August and September of the same year. The attack on September 9 was responsible for burning the gristmill to the ground. They additionally torched a saw mill, as well as several houses and barns, killing several of the animals contained within.

None of the American attackers were able to capture Talbot in the series of raids. They did, however, capture Talbot's bridge builder, Mahlon Burwell and kept him imprisoned for six months in Chillicothe, Ohio. The gristmill, destroyed in the raids, was never rebuilt which may have slowed the expanse of settlement from that point forward.

== Present day ==
Port Talbot was geographically located at the mouth of Talbot Creek. No remnants exist from the settlement and it is reported as being a location noted only on maps.

== See also ==
- Talbot Trail
