= Thomas Talbot (Upper Canada) =

Canadian soldier and colonial administrator

Colonel the Honourable Thomas Talbot
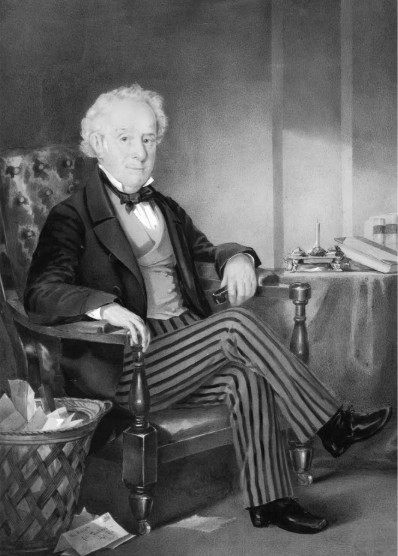
- Portrait of Colonel Thomas Talbot
- Born: July 19, 1771; Malahide Castle, County Dublin, Kingdom of Ireland
- Died: February 5, 1853 (aged 81); London, Canada West, Province of Canada
- Occupations: Soldier; settler; politician
- Known for: Founding the community of Port Talbot, Ontario

Thomas Talbot (July 19, 1771 – February 5, 1853) was an Irish-born Canadian soldier and colonial administrator. He founded the community of Port Talbot, Ontario, which was at one time the most prosperous town in the region due to his insistence on building quality roads, and was responsible for enticing 50,000 people to settle in the Thames River area.

== Background ==
Talbot was born at Malahide Castle in County Dublin, Ireland. He was the fourth son of Richard Talbot and Margaret Talbot, 1st Baroness Talbot of Malahide (see the Baron Talbot of Malahide). Richard Talbot, 2nd Baron Talbot de Malahide and Sir John Talbot were his elder brothers.

== Early military career ==
Talbot received a commission in the army as ensign before he was twelve years old, and was appointed at sixteen to aid his relative, the Lord Lieutenant of Ireland. He saw active service in Holland and at Gibraltar.

== Canada ==
Talbot immigrated to Canada in 1791, where he became personal secretary to John Graves Simcoe, Lieutenant-Governor of Upper Canada. After returning to England, Talbot convinced the government to allow him to implement a land settlement scheme along the shore of Lake Erie. He chose property which today is in Elgin County, Ontario in adjoining townships, Dunwich and Aldborough (today called West Elgin), when his petition for 5,000 acres (20 km^{2}) was granted in 1803. It was May 21, 1803, that he landed at a spot which has been called since Port Talbot, and built a log cabin. Nearby, he added a sawmill, a cooper shop, a blacksmith shop, and a poultry house along with a barn. When settlers began to arrive in 1809, Talbot added a gristmill as well.

Here he ruled as an absolute, if erratic, potentate, doling out strips of land to people of his choosing, a group that emphatically did not include supporters of the American Revolution, liberals or anyone insufficiently respectful. For every settler he placed on 50 acres (200,000 m^{2}) of land, Talbot received an additional 200 acres (0.81 km^{2}) for himself. He wanted permanent and compact settlement. One of the conditions attached to the free grant of 50 acres (200,000 m^{2}), which he offered to settlers, was the right to purchase an additional hundred and 50 acres (200,000 m^{2}) at $3 each, and the promise of a road in front of each farm within three and a half years. The other condition was the building of a small house and the clearing and sowing of 10 acres (40,000 m^{2}) of land.

The result of the road-making provision was that the settlement became noted for its good roads, especially for that named Talbot Road. By the late 1820s Colonel Thomas Talbot had organized the construction of a 300-mile-long (480 km) road linking the Detroit River and Lake Ontario as part of a grand settlement enterprise in the south western peninsula. By 1820, all of the land originally allotted to Talbot had been taken up. From 1814 to 1837 he settled 50,000 people on 650,000 acres (2,600 km^{2}) of land in the Thames River area. Many, if not most, of the settlers were American. He had placed about 20,000 immigrants on the Talbot settlement by 1826.

Because he had done his work so well, the government placed the southwestern part of the province under his charge. This afforded Talbot the opportunity of extending the Talbot road from the Long Point region to the Detroit River. In 1823, Talbot decided to name the port after his friend Edward Smith-Stanley, 14th Earl of Derby, whose son, Frederick would become Canada's governor general and donate to the ice-hockey world the trophy that still bears his name. According to returns placed before the House of Assembly in 1836, title to some 5,280,000 acres (21,400 km^{2}) located in twenty-nine townships had at one time gone through his hands.

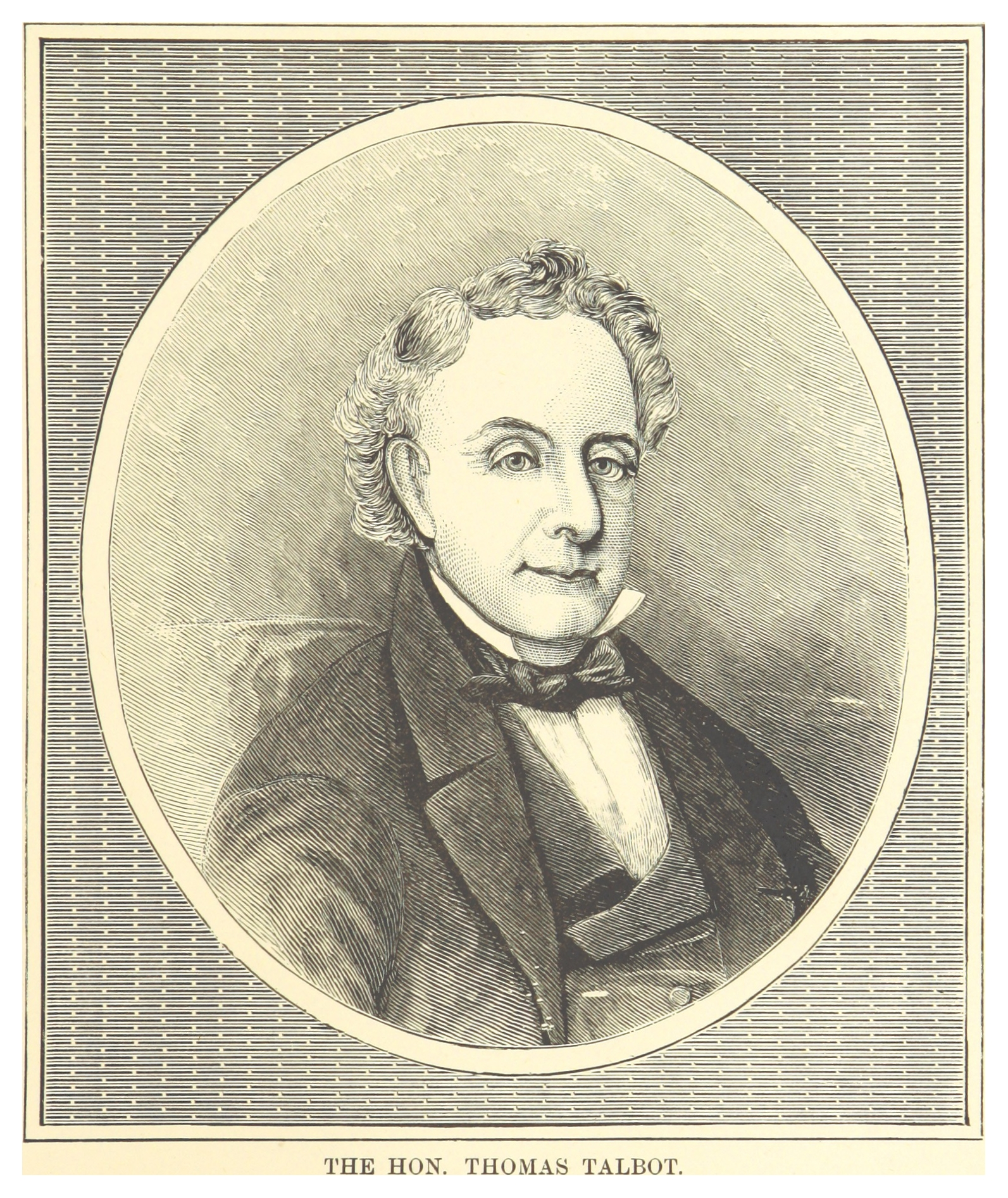
Thomas Talbot

Talbot's administration was regarded as despotic. He was infamous for registering settlers' names on the local settlement map in pencil and if displeased, was alleged to have erased their entry. However, his insistence on provision of good roads (notably the eponymous Talbot Trail), maintenance of the roads by the settlers, and the removal of Crown and clergy reserves from main roads quickly resulted in the Talbot Settlement becoming the most prosperous part of the province. Eventually, however, he began to make political demands on the settlers, after which his power was reduced by the provincial government. Talbot's abuse of power was a contributing factor in the Upper Canada Rebellion of 1837.

During the War of 1812, Talbot commanded the 1st Middlesex Militia.

Talbot's home in Port Talbot was called Malahide (which was demolished in 1997, generating much public outcry from heritage preservationists). Talbot died in the home of George Macbeth at London, Ontario, in 1853 and is interred in the cemetery of St. Peters Anglican Church near Tyrconnell, Ontario, in Elgin County. Talbot eventually moved to London where he lived until his death in 1853. When he died in 1853, at age 82, he had been visited at his historic home on Lake Erie by General Isaac Brock, Francis Gore, Mrs. Anna Jameson, Sir Peregrine Maitland, Sir John Colborne, Chief Justice Sir John Beverley Robinson, his brother the Honourable Peter Robinson, Dr. William Dunlop, Bishops Stuart and Strachan, Sir George Arthur, the Duke of Richmond, Lord Aylmer and many others. He lies buried at Port Talbot overlooking his beloved Lake Erie.

Talbotville (a community in Southwold, Ontario) and the city of St. Thomas, Ontario, were named after him, as well as Colonel Talbot Road and Talbot Street in both London and St. Thomas.
