= William Thomas (architect) =

Anglo-Canadian architect (c. 1799 – 1860)

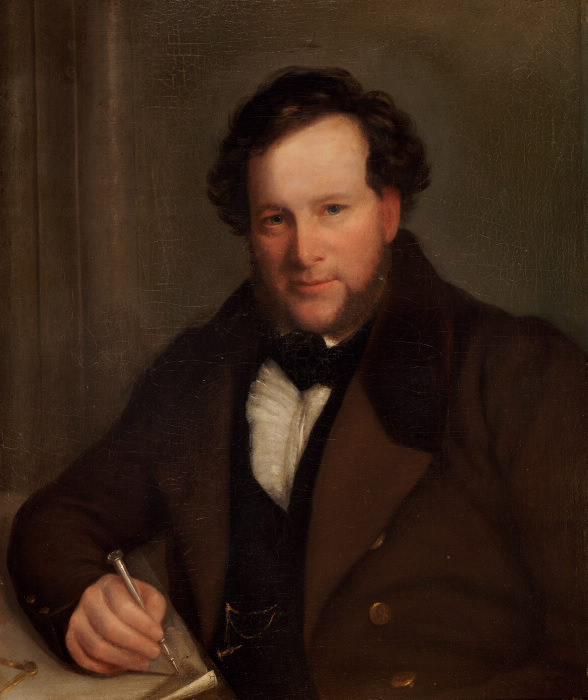
- William Thomas, 1830s
- Born: 1799; Suffolk, England
- Died: 26 December 1860 (aged 60–61); Toronto, Canada West, Province of Canada
- Occupation: Architect
- Design: Brock's Monument

William Thomas (c. 1799 – 26 December 1860) was an Anglo-Canadian architect. His son William Tutin Thomas (1829–1892) was also an architect, working mostly in Montreal, Quebec.

== Life ==
Thomas was born in Suffolk, England. He was apprenticed to a local builder after his family moved to Gloucestershire. His two older brothers became master glaziers and younger brother was the sculptor John Thomas, apprenticed under Sir Charles Barry and A. W. Pugin (born 1813).

On completion of his apprenticeship, William moved to Birmingham to work for Richard Tutin, a builder and surveyor. He became a member of the Tutin family by marrying Martha, a member of the Tutin family. During this time he revised his title to architect, however, a depression in the city forced the closure of the firm and he moved to Leamington.

Thomas began his own practice at Leamington Spa in 1831 where he designed many buildings, but in 1837 went bankrupt. In 1843, during a depression in the British building industry, he emigrated to Canada with his wife and 10 children to Toronto, where his career flourished. He designed some of the finest Decorated Gothic Revival architecture in Ontario.

Between 1845 and 1850, Thomas worked extensively with the trio of Scottish sculptors John Cochrane and Brothers. They were responsible for work such as the interior decorations of St. Paul's Cathedral, stone and stucco ornamentation inside St. Michael's Cathedral Basilica and stone carving, including the coat of arms in the central gable, at Bishop's Palace, and exterior embellishments on St. Lawrence Hall.

He was also Toronto's city engineer when John George Howard made a trip to England in 1853. He died in Toronto, aged about sixty. Two of his sons, William Tutin Thomas and Cyrus Pole Thomas, also became architects.

Thomas is sometimes incorrectly credited with the architectural design and the elaborate stone carvings on Victoria Hall in Cobourg, Ontario. In fact, Kivas Tully designed the building and the fine sandstone carvings are the work of master stone carver Charles Thomas Thomas (no relation).

== Works ==
Project	Location	Dates	Notes	Source	Image
Lansdowne Circus	Royal Leamington Spa, England	1832–1835	Horseshoe-shaped project of eight pairs of Georgian semi-detached houses and two end-villas in English spa town.		
St. Paul's Cathedral	London, Ontario, Canada	1844–1846	Anglican cathedral in the Gothic Revival style.		
St. Michael's Cathedral Episcopal Palace	Toronto	1845	Gothic and Tudor Revival episcopal residence, cathedral rectory, and chancery office. The carved coat of arms on the exterior view here is the work of John Cochrane and Brothers		
6 Dublin Street South	Guelph, Ontario	1847	Limestone commercial building in the Georgian style. Home to the Guelph Civic Museum between 1980 and 2011.		
St. Michael's Cathedral	Toronto	1845–1848	Designed in the English Gothic Revival style, it was Toronto's largest church upon completion.		
Toronto House of Industry	110 Edward Street, Toronto	1848	Tudor-Gothic workhouse now used as the Laughlen Lodge seniors residence.		
Oakham House	322 Church Street, Toronto Metropolitan University, Toronto	1848	Thomas' Gothic Revival residence and office. Later additions replaced the office wing.		
Niagara District Court House and Town Hall	Niagara, Ontario	1846–1848	Neoclassical building used to house courts, the town hall, and a market in Niagara-on-the-Lake. Now used as a theatre.		
Kent County Courthouse and Jail	81 Stanley Avenue, Chatham, Ontario	1848–1850	The Neoclassical limestone building was completed in 1850, and features a balustraded balcony, a prominent pediment, and a crowning cupola.		
St. Lawrence Hall	Toronto	1850–1851	Designed in the Renaissance Revival style, it was Toronto's first public meeting hall.		
Brock's Monument	Queenston Heights, Queenston, Ontario	1853–1856	Monument with 56-metre (185 ft) column dedicated to Major General Sir Isaac Brock, one of Canada's heroes of the War of 1812.		Brock's Monument, Queenston, Ontario
St. Paul's Presbyterian Church	Hamilton, Ontario	1854–1857	Originally St. Andrew's Presbyterian Church. Gothic Revival in style.		
Old City Hall	Guelph, Ontario	1856–1857	Renaissance Revival town hall and market.		
New Quebec Customs House	Quebec City, Quebec	1856–1860	Neoclassical customs house.		
St. Matthew's United Church	Halifax, Nova Scotia	1857–1860	Originally St. Matthew's Presbyterian Church. Gothic Revival in style.		
Halifax Old County Court House	Halifax, Nova Scotia	1858–1862	Renaissance Revival courthouse.		Halifax Old County Court House
Don Jail	Toronto	1859–1864	Italianate jail.		
Lansdowne Crescent	Royal Leamington Spa, England	1835–1838, 1866	Curving terrace of Neoclassical rowhouses.		
Duncan McIntyre House (Craguie)	Montreal	1880s	Romanesque Scottish Baronial residence of Duncan McIntyre.		
Ballinahinch	Hamilton, Ontario	1848–50	Mid-Victorian mansion commissioned by merchant Æneas Kennedy.		

== See also ==
- List of oldest buildings and structures in Toronto
