= Charles Thomas Thomas =

Charles Thomas Thomas (Master stone carver)
- Born: 26 July 1820; London, England
- Died: 25 December 1867 (aged 47); Quincy, Illinois, USA
- Occupation: Architect
- Practice: Charles T. Thomas
- Projects: Royal Navy Dockyard (Hamilton, Bermuda); Brock's Monument (Queenston, Ontario, Canada); Victoria Hall (Cobourg, Ontario, Canada); Bank of Montreal (Cobourg, Ontario, Canada); East and West Blocks of Canadian Parliament Buildings (Ottawa, Ontario, Canada); Quincy Railway Bridge (Mississippi River, near Quincy, Illinois, USA); with William Cubitts and Company, London, England building contractors.

Entrance to Victoria Hall in Cobourg, Ontario, Canada

Charles Thomas Thomas (26 July 1820 – 25 December 1867) was an Anglo-Canadian stone carver and builder in the mid-19th century. He was the son of a stonemason (Charles Thomas, senior), and at least one brother (Frederick Thomas) was also a stonemason.

== Early life and work ==
Born in London, he trained in England under William Cubitt (1791-1863) and Company, one of England's prominent Victorian building contractors. Charles Thomas apprenticed with Cubitt and Company in the 1840s. William Cubitt and Company had several important commissions including: Covent Garden Market, Euston Station, repairs to Westminster Bridge, extension to National Gallery, etc.

== Career ==
=== 1851 ===
In 1851 Charles Thomas travelled to North America. He was appointed foreman of works with the Works Department of the British Royal Navy, responsible for development of the strategic Royal Naval Dockyard, Bermuda.

=== 1853–1856 ===
In 1853 Charles Thomas travelled to Canada to work with Worthington Brothers, a well known Toronto-based building contractor that specialized in sandstone construction. Charles Thomas supervised the stone work and is possibly responsible for stone carvings on the second Brock's Monument, (Queenston, Ontario) - a high-profile public works project in Victorian Canada. Brock's Monument was designed by noted Toronto architect, William Thomas (no relation).

=== 1857–1859 ===
In 1857 C.T. Thomas relocated to Cobourg, Ontario to become the master stone carver and contractor for the stone cutting on Cobourg's Victoria Hall, designed by Toronto architect, Kivas Tully. Again, Thomas was working with Worthington Brothers, using Cleveland sandstone quarried from a quarry owned and operated by John Worthington. The Victoria Hall stone carvings and ornamentation are considered among the finest in Canada.

The Cobourg Star for 7 July 1858, reported on the progress being made by Charles Thomas on the main entrance to Victoria Hall (see photo, right), saying:

"a vast amount of stone cutting has been accomplished .... The carvings on the spandrels of the chief entrance are exceedingly fine. They comprise the national emblems of the three United Kingdoms - the rose, the thistle, and the shamrock disposed on either side by an ancient lyre. These carvings together with the fine bearded face which forms the keystone of the arch [see photo above] are the work of Mr Thomas, contractor for the stone cutting and they certainly do him very great credit".

A handful of articles published between the 1960s to 1980s, incorrectly attributed credit for Victoria Hall's stone work to Toronto architect William Thomas, presumably based solely on the 7 July 1858 Cobourg newspaper article noted above (with its vague reference to "Mr. Thomas"). There is no documentation linking architect William Thomas to either the design or construction of Cobourg's Victoria Hall. Clearly the "Mr. Thomas" being referenced in the local newspaper is Charles T. Thomas considering the range of documentation outlined in this article.

C.T. Thomas was also contractor for the stonework on an impressive Bank of Montreal (demolished in 1960) in downtown Cobourg, designed by Montreal architect James H. Springle.

While in Cobourg, Charles T. Thomas also established a stone masonry business. It was in operation from 1857 to 1859. Two works from this private enterprise are known to survive - an ornately carved sandstone grave marker for Thomas Lloyd in the form of a sandstone Celtic cross (located in St. Peter's Anglican Cemetery at 890 Ontario Street in Cobourg) and a white marble wall plaque honouring a prominent Cobourg citizen found inside St. Peter's Anglican Church in downtown Cobourg. Both of these surviving monuments are signed. "C.T. Thomas". In September 1858 the Cobourg newspaper reported on the production of the Celtic cross (see below). The article stated that the same "Mr. Thomas" that carved the Celtic grave marker was also responsible for the stone carvings on Victoria Hall.

=== 1859–1866 ===
In 1859 Port Hope, Ontario building firm, Jones, Haycock and Company (principals: Ralph Jones, Edward Haycock and Thomas Curtis Clarke) won the contract to build the East and West Blocks of the Parliament Buildings in Ottawa, Ontario. Charles T. Thomas was recruited as Chief Superintendent of Works on this national public works project. The Canadian Parliament Buildings project was among the largest public works efforts in 19th Century Canada.

=== 1866–1867 ===
On 1 December 1866, Charles T. Thomas relocated to Quincy, Illinois to become Master Stonemason and Superintendent of Stone Masonry on the construction of a massive railway bridge over the Mississippi River for the Chicago, Burlington and Quincy Railway. The bridge was designed by Thomas Curtis Clarke of Port Hope, Ontario, Canada, who would soon become one of the most celebrated civil engineers in North America. C.T. Thomas met Clarke while living in Cobourg (only a few miles east of Clarke's town of Port Hope). C.T. Thomas first joined Clarke on the Ottawa Parliament Buildings project then the Quincy Bridge (which opened in 1868).

== Death ==
In the fall of 1867 Charles Thomas was supervising the lifting of rocks on a derrick when the structure collapsed, crushing his left leg. It had to be amputated but an infection set in and he died on 25 December 1867. His remains were returned to Ottawa where he was buried.

=== Obituary ===
His obituary was published in the 28 December 1867, issue of the Ottawa Times newspaper:

"A short time since it became our painful duty to record a sad accident to our late fellow townsman, Mr. Charles T. Thomas, which rendered necessary the amputation of a leg. Subsequent to the amputation he suffered very greatly, and afterwards a fever set in which ended in death on Christmas Day. The remains will be brought to this city for interment, arriving next Tuesday morning. The funeral will be at- tended by the Masons and members of the St. George's Society, of which due notice will be given. The deceased gentleman was, during the erection of the Departmental Buildings in this city, Chief Superintendent of Works, under Messrs. Jones, Haycock and Co., and in that capacity earned for himself a high reputation for zeal and integrity. He was a skilled and experienced stonemason, several years of his life having been passed in the employ of Messrs. Cubit and Co., the eminent contractors of London, England. Mr. Thomas was for sometime Superintendent of Public Works under the Imperial Government of Bermuda, which place he left for Canada about the year 1852; since then and up to the moment of the sad accident resulting in his death, he was engaged as subcontractor in the erection of many important buildings on this continent. The present national monument at Queenston reared by a grateful people to the memory of the "Gallant Brock," was erected under his supervision, so was the Montreal Bank and Town Hall in Cobourg, the latter considered to be one of the handsomest buildings in the Dominion. The subject of our notice was in every respect an excellent man. In business he was strictly correct in all his transactions; as a husband and father, most affectionate, as a philanthropist, his peer was not to be found in this city. In his death the St. George's Society experience the loss of a most indefatigable member, and with us, they mourn over the sad event which has removed him from our intercourse, and deeply sympathize with his bereaved widow and afflicted family."
