= John Macdonell =

Canadian politician (1785–1812)

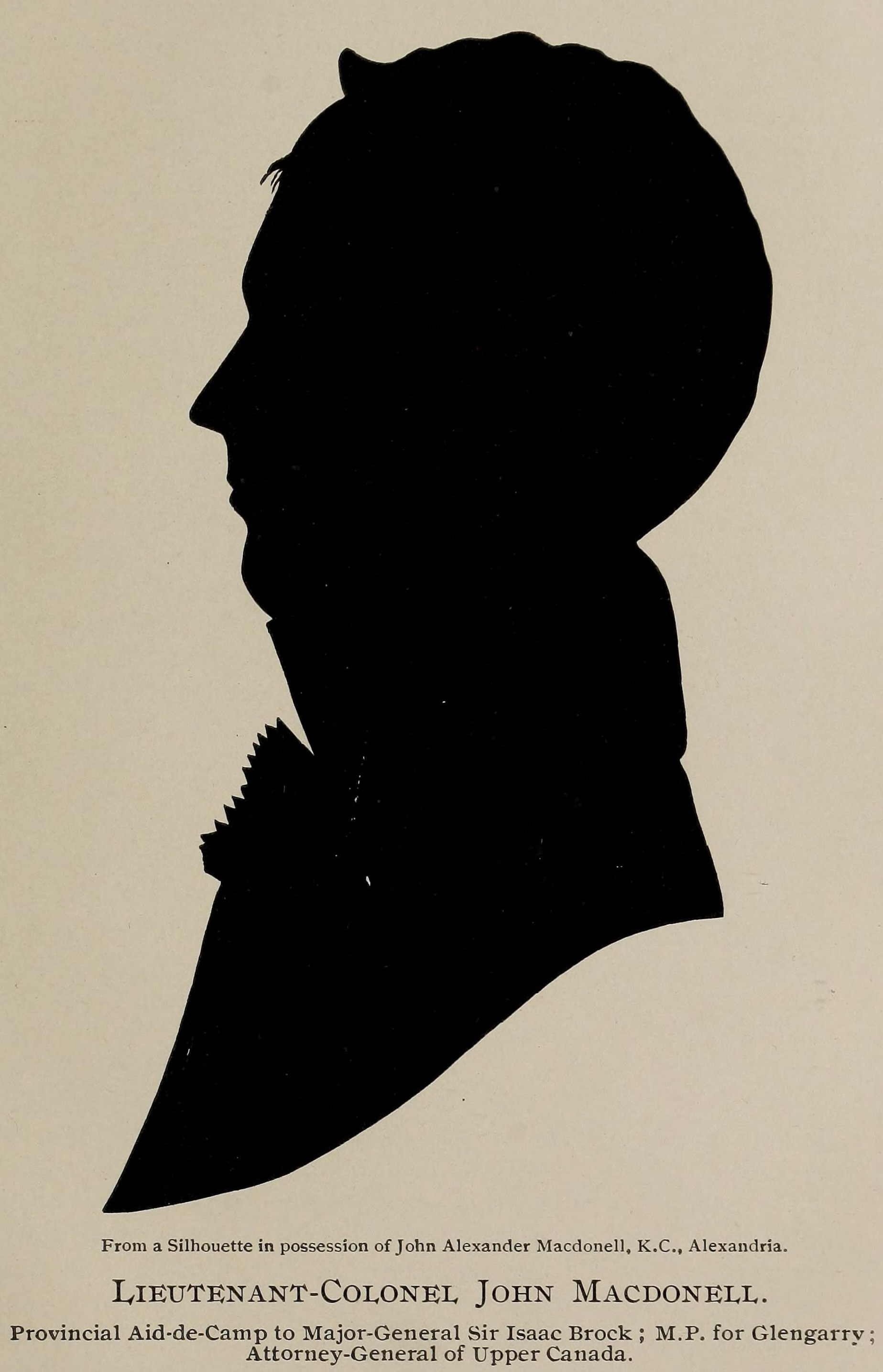
- From Richardson's War of 1812 by Alexander Clark Casselman
- Born: 19 April 1785; Near Aberchalder, Scotland
- Died: 14 October 1812 (aged 27); Queenston, Upper Canada
- Military career
- Allegiance: United Kingdom
- Branch: British Army
- Service years: ?–1812
- Rank: Lieutenant colonel
- Unit: York Militia
- Conflicts: War of 1812; Battle of Queenston Heights †

Lieutenant Colonel John Macdonell of Greenfield (19 April 1785 – 14 October 1812) was an aide-de-camp to British Major General Sir Isaac Brock during the War of 1812, dying in the Battle of Queenston Heights.

== Life ==
He was born on 19 April 1785 in Scotland near Aberchalder and came to Canada when he was seven years old. There, he studied to become a lawyer and was called to the bar at the age of 23, opening his own law office. An interest in politics earned him a seat on the legislature and an appointment as attorney-general.

He also became a lieutenant colonel in the York Militia and, at the outbreak of the War of 1812, became secretary and provincial aide-de-camp to General Isaac Brock. On 13 October 1812, during the Battle of Queenston Heights, Brock was struck and killed by an American musket ball. Despite being a lawyer by trade with little military experience, Lieutenant-Colonel Macdonell, along with Captain John Williams of the 49th Foot, led a second attempt to retake the Redan, one that was very nearly successful.

With Williams' men of the 49th starting from brush to the right of the line near the escarpment and Macdonell's anchoring the left, the force of between 70 and 80 men (more than half of whom were militia) advanced toward the Redan Battery. The U.S. forces under the command of Captain John E. Wool had been reinforced by more troops who had just made their way up the path to the top of the Heights, and Macdonell faced some four hundred troops.

Despite the disadvantage in numbers as well as attacking a fixed position, Williams' and Macdonell's small force was driving the opposing force to the edge of the gorge on which the Redan was situated, and seemed on the verge of success before the Americans were able to regroup and stand firm. The momentum of the battle turned when a musket ball hit Macdonell's mount, causing it to rear and twist around. Another shot hit Macdonnell in the small of the back, causing him to fall from the horse. He was removed from the battlefield but succumbed to his injuries early the next day.

== Brock's Monument ==
On 16 October 1812 Lieut. Col. Macdonell, along with General Brock, was buried in the bastion at the northeast corner of Fort George. In 1824, both bodies were moved to Queenston Heights to be interred in the first Brock's Monument. It is documented that when moving the remains someone noted that while Lieut. Col. Macdonell was in a later state of decomposition, General Brock's remains were near perfect. In 1840, Irish-Canadian Benjamin Lett was suspected of (but never charged with) setting an explosive charge that heavily damaged the first monument. When a new monument was built, there was no mention of Macdonell on it. But inside the monument there is a brass plaque which reads:

Beneath are deposited the mortal remains of Lieut. Colonel John Macdonell P.A. D.C. and Aide-de-camp to the lamented Major General Sir Isaac Brock. K.B. Who fell mortally wounded at the Battle of Queenston on 13 October 1812 and died on the following day. His remains were removed and reinterred with due solemnity, on 13 October 1853.

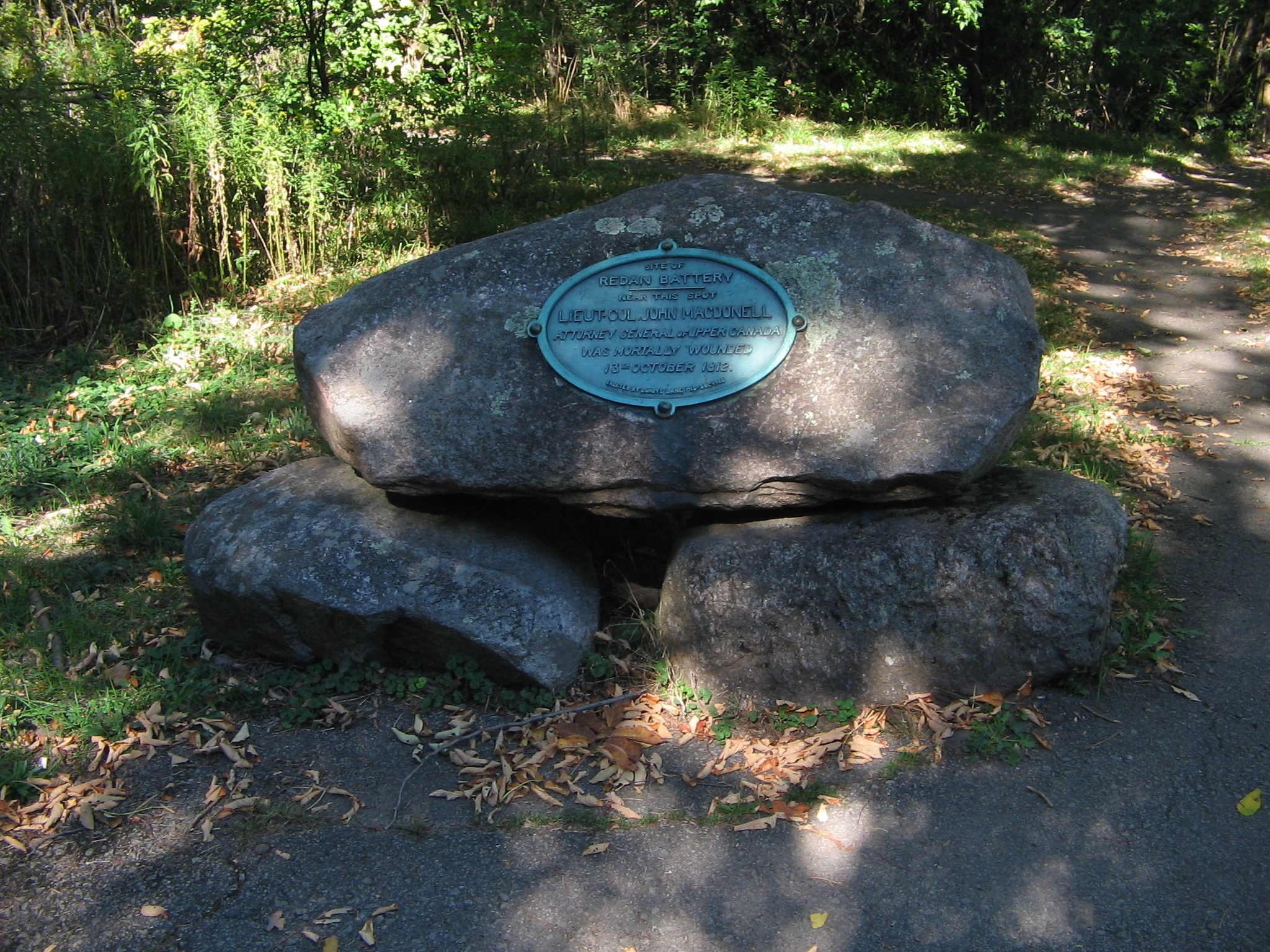
Macdonell monument at the Redan Battery

At the Redan Battery, a plaque mounted on a trio of large stones also serves as a monument to Macdonell. The plaque reads:

Site of Redan Battery | Near this spot Lieut-Col. John Macdonell Attorney General of Upper Canada was mortally wounded 13 October 1812.

== Legacy ==
In his 1984 album From Fresh Water, the late Canadian folk singer Stan Rogers immortalised Macdonell in the song "Macdonnell on the Heights". He laments that despite Macdonell's courage, "not one in ten thousand knows your name".
