= Queenston Heights =

Geographical feature in Ontario, Canada

Coordinates: 43°09′37″N 79°03′08″W

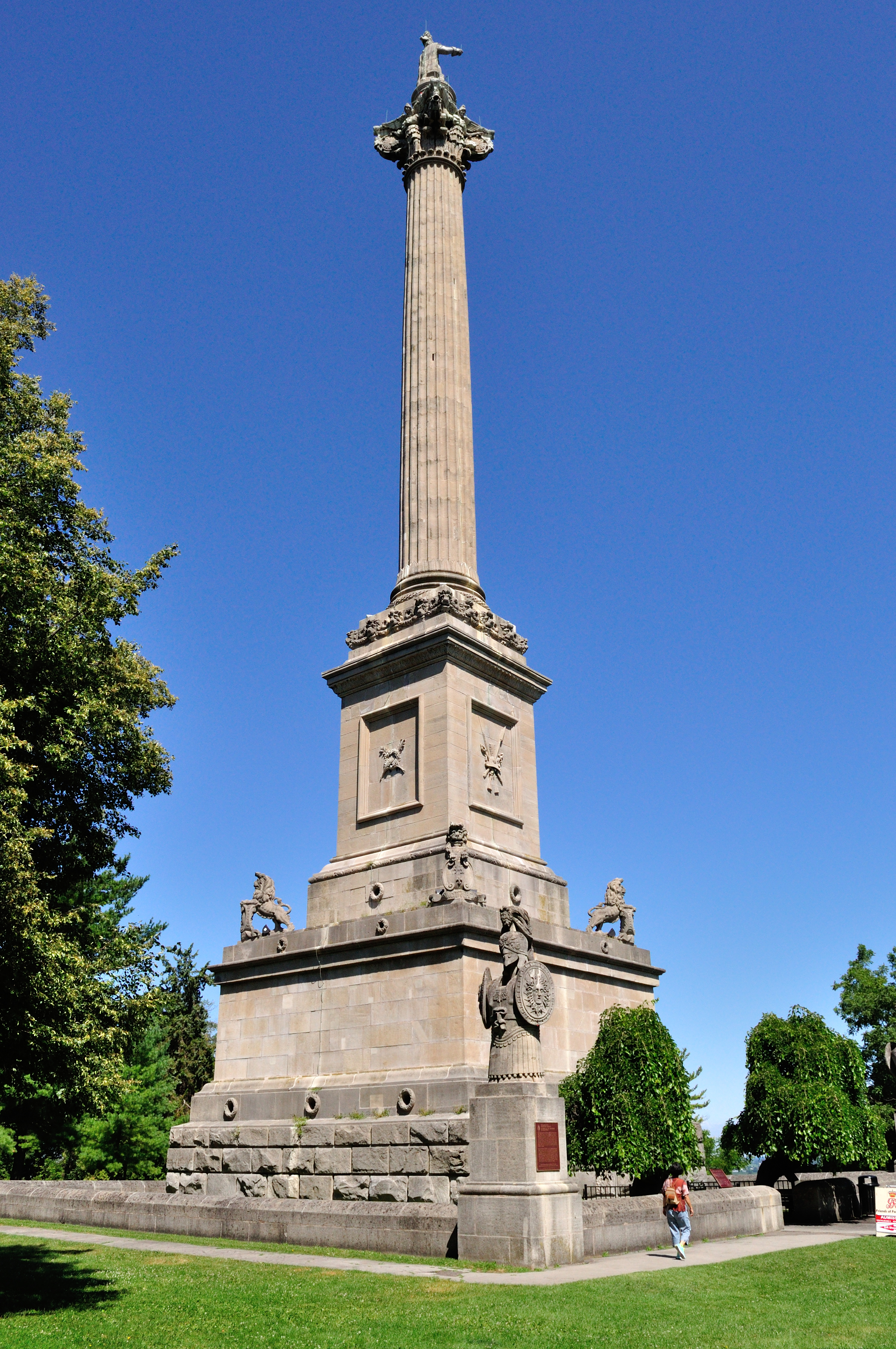
Brock's Monument 2015

The Queenston Heights is a geographical feature of the Niagara Escarpment immediately above the village of Queenston, Ontario, Canada. Its geography is a promontory formed where the escarpment is divided by the Niagara River. The promontory forms a cliff face of approximately 100 m (approximately 300 ft).

== War of 1812 ==
Queenston Heights was the site of the War of 1812 Battle of Queenston Heights, where Major-General Sir Isaac Brock was killed in action in the defence of Upper Canada (now Ontario). It is mentioned in the 1867 song "The Maple Leaf Forever":

At Queenston Heights and Lundy's Lane
Our brave fathers, side by side,
For freedom, homes, and loved ones dear,
Firmly stood and nobly died.

And those dear rights which they maintained,
We swear to yield them never.
Our watchword evermore shall be,
The Maple Leaf forever!

== War memorials ==
Queenston Heights is the site of Brock's Monument and a monument to War of 1812 heroine Laura Secord. There are 235 stairs inside the monument, leading to a viewing area close to the top. The site was designated a National Historic Site of Canada in 1968. Fort Drummond, also located at Queenston Heights, is separately recognized as a National Historic Site.
