= Ballinahinch =

Mansion in Hamilton, Ontario, Canada

Coordinates: 43.24706°N 79.87477°W

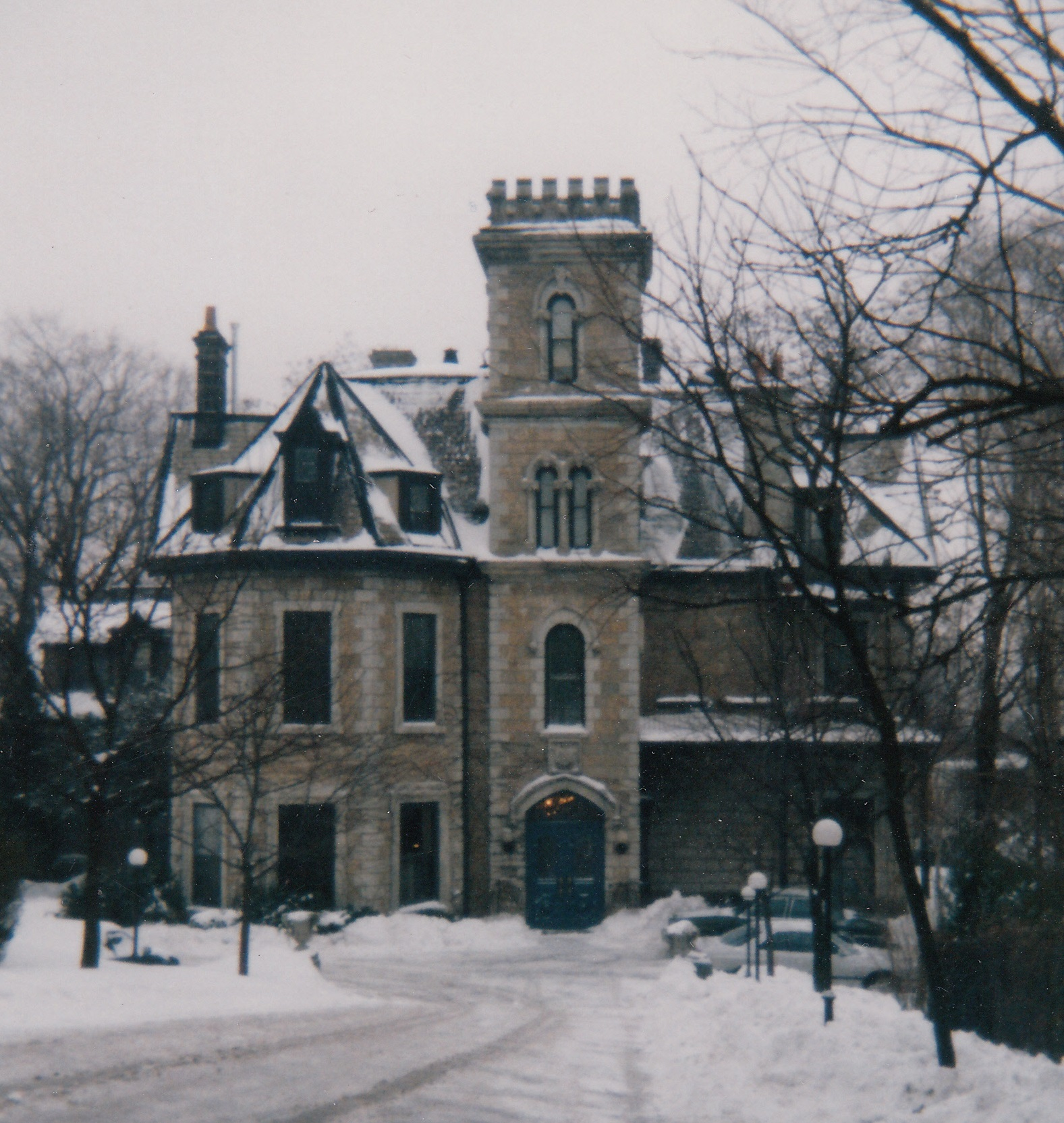
Ballinahinch in the 1990s

Ballinahinch is a mid-Victorian mansion in Hamilton, Canada. It is recognized as an historic building under the Ontario Heritage Act.

Ballinahinch dates back to 1848 when merchant Æneas Kennedy commissioned a home from architect William Thomas. Thomas provided plans for a stone villa to be located on a recessed site at the head of James Street South. He recommended Hamilton builder Peter Balfour to construct the residence, which was initially called Wilderness House, and was built between 1849-1850.

Fire destroyed Wilderness House on December 11, 1853. The subsequent reconstruction may have included some changes from Thomas’ original design. Kennedy died on November 8, 1854. In 1858, Mrs. Kennedy married Robert Ferrie, who joined her at Wilderness House. The estate was sold to Edward Martin, a lawyer, about 1871.

A descendant of the Martins of Galway, Ireland, who resided in the village of Ballinahinch, Martin renamed his Hamilton house Ballinahinch. In the twentieth century, Ballinahinch became one of numerous southwest Hamilton homes purchased by developer Sam Henson, who renamed it Henson Park and divided it into several flats, as post world war II taxes rose and the house became too expensive for a single family.

In 1980, Ballinahinch was substantially renovated as a residential condominium. This project included reconstruction of the long-demolished gatekeeper's lodge.

Nina Chapple, former City of Hamilton Senior Cultural Planner, said “Ballinahinch is one of the last remaining buildings of a compound of stone 1850s estates that ran across along the lower shoulder of the escarpment. It was an absolutely stunning district in its day.”
