= Brock's Monument =

Historical monument in Canada

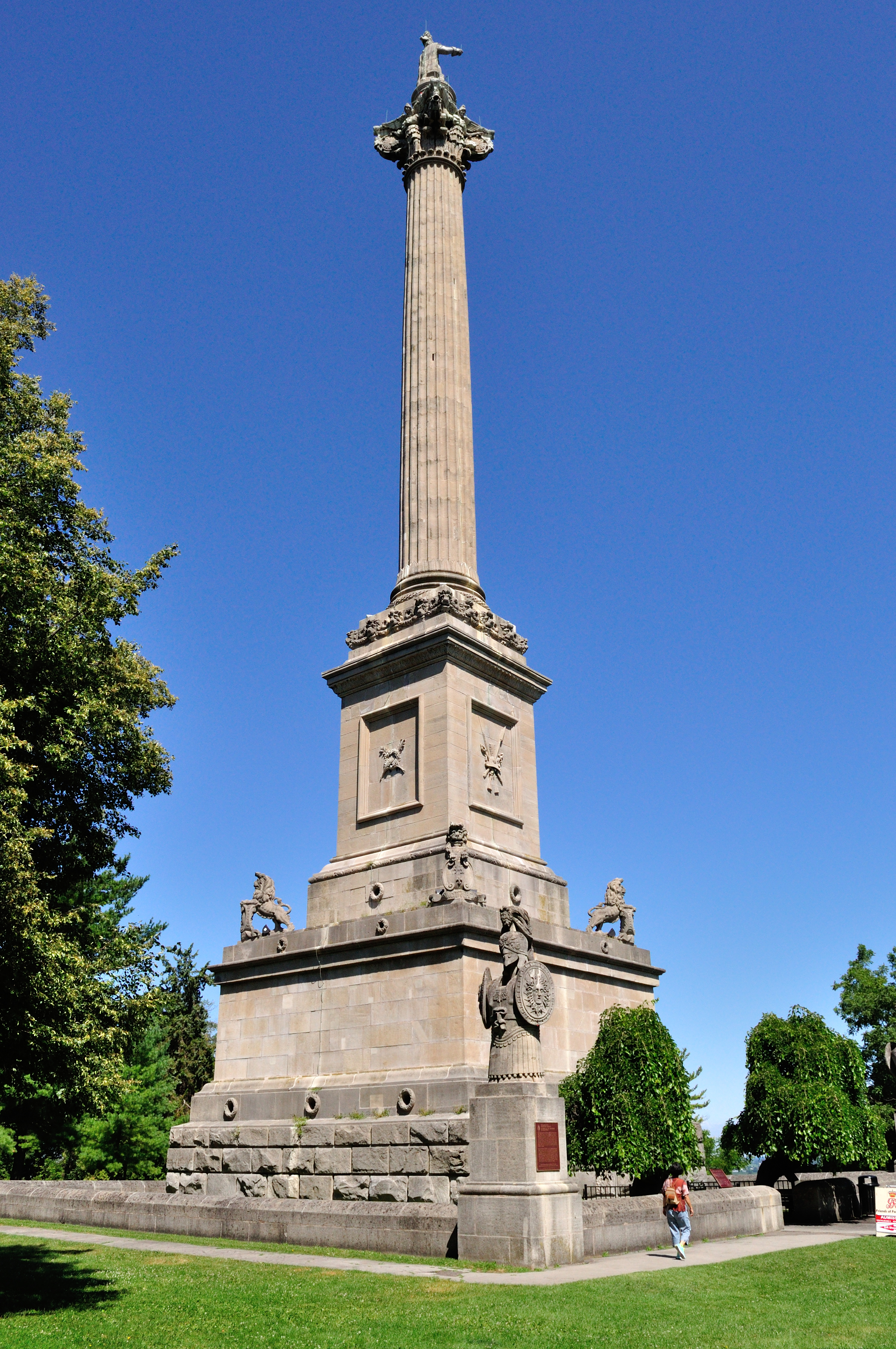
- Interactive map of Brock's Monument
- Location: Queenston Heights, Queenston, Ontario
- Coordinates: 43°09′36.5″N 79°03′11.0″W
- Designer: William Thomas
- Material: limestone
- Height: 56 m (184 ft)
- Beginning date: 1853
- Completion date: 1856
- Opening date: 1859
- Dedicated to: Sir Isaac Brock

Brock's Monument is a 56-metre (185 ft) column atop Queenston Heights in Queenston, Ontario, Canada, dedicated to Major General Sir Isaac Brock, one of Canada's heroes of the War of 1812. Brock, a British Army officer in charge of defending Upper Canada from a United States invasion, and one of his aides-de-camp, Lieutenant-Colonel John Macdonell, are interred at the monument's base on the heights above the battlefield where both fell during the Battle of Queenston Heights. The current monument was constructed between 1853 and 1856, which replaced an earlier Monument to Brock on the battlefield (1824–1840). Parks Canada maintains the monument, the most imposing feature of Queenston Heights National Historic Site. It is the fourth oldest war memorial in Canada.

== History ==
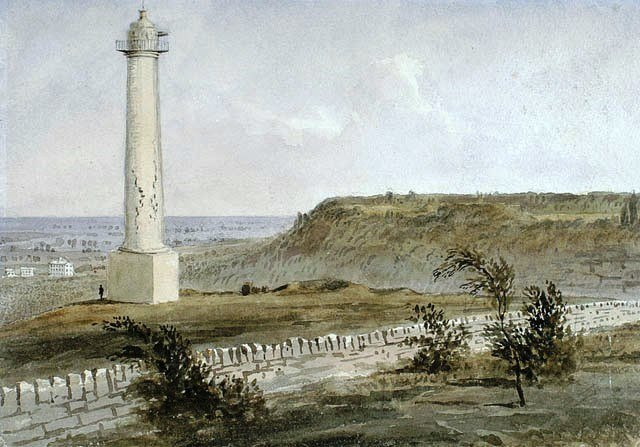
1st Brock's Monument (1824–1840)

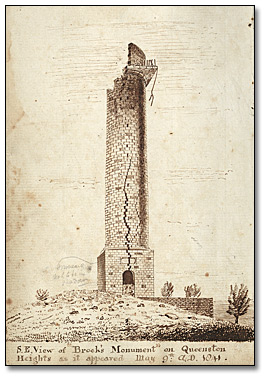
1st Brock's Monument showing explosion damage (9 May 1841)

Brock died by gunshot wound to the chest on the morning of October 13, 1812, leading a charge of British regulars and Canadian militia up the Heights to regain the Redan Battery, earlier captured by American infantry forces under Captain John Wool. One of Brock's aides-de-camp, John Macdonell was also mortally wounded while attempting to lead a subsequent abortive charge when his mount was shot from beneath him and fell on him. The combined British, Canadian, and First Nations forces eventually won a resounding victory under the command of Major-General Roger Hale Sheaffe.

Brock and his aide were initially buried in the north-east corner of Fort George in nearby Niagara-on-the-Lake. This corner has come to be known as Brock's Bastion and is immortalized as such by a small stone bearing that inscription. A campaign began among prominent Upper Canadians to honour Brock, whose dramatic death provided a rallying point during and after the war as a symbol of Canadian independence from the United States. This led to the erection of the first Brock's Monument, a 135-foot (41.1m) Tuscan column with a viewing platform at the top. Construction began in 1823, and the monument was inaugurated October 13, 1824.

During its construction, William Lyon Mackenzie suggested that a capsule be sealed within the monument containing an inscription written by Mackenzie, coins, a copy of the Upper Canada Gazette and the first issue of the Colonial Advocate. The Upper Canada Lieutenant-Governor Peregrine Maitland ordered its removal because he did not want to include a newspaper critical of the government in the monument.

On April 17, 1840, an explosive charge did serious and irreparable damage to the monument although it failed to bring it down. The attack was presumed to have been orchestrated by Benjamin Lett, an anti-British agitator and participant in the 1837 Rebellion although a subsequent Assize failed to confirm this. Brock and Macdonell's remains were removed after the monument's disassemblage and reinterred in the Hamilton Family Burial Grounds at Niagara Parkway and Dee Road in Queenston.

=== Replacement ===
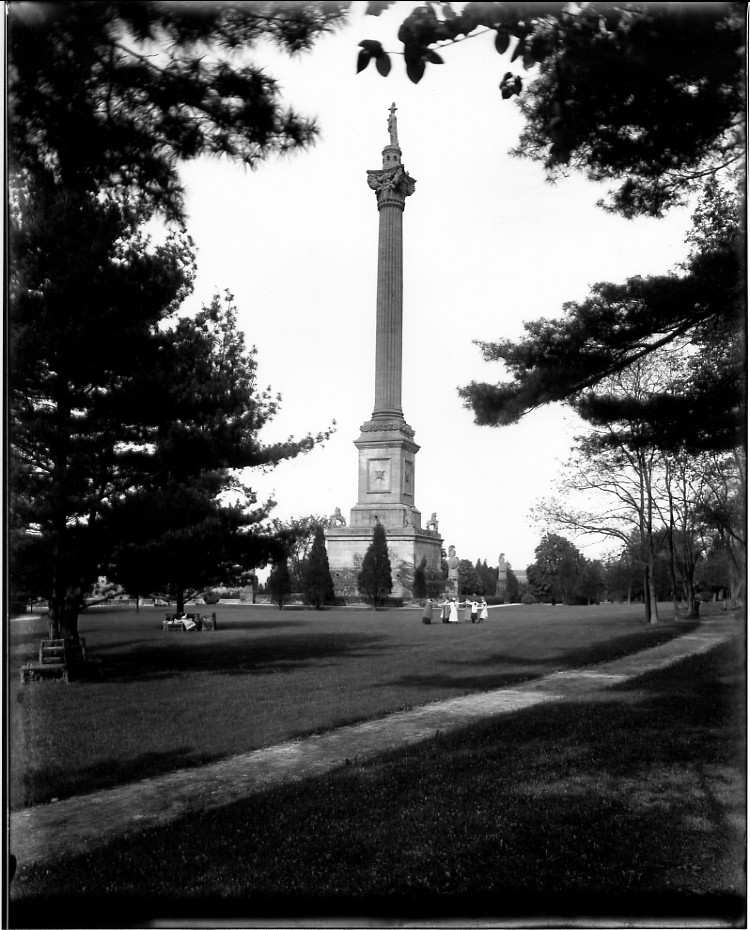
The second monument in 1915

A campaign to rebuild the monument began almost immediately. In 1852, Toronto architect William Thomas had his design selected for a monument even grander than the first. A master stone carver named Charles Thomas Thomas (1820–1867) supervised the construction and stone carving of Brock's Monument. He was an English-born stone carver. Thomas was employed by Worthington Brothers of Toronto, contractors for the stone work on Brock's Monument. Construction began in 1853 again using limestone from the nearby Queenston Quarry and was completed three years later. The remains of Brock and Macdonell were led back up Queenston Heights and interred for the fourth time. The monument was officially inaugurated on October 13, 1859. A smaller obelisk, closer to the exact site of Brock's death, was dedicated by Prince Edward (later King Edward VII), in 1860.

On the re-interment, two oval plates were attached to Brock's coffin. They read:

Here lie the earthly remains of a brave and virtuous hero, /
Major-General Sir Isaac Brock, /
Commander of the British forces, / and President Administering / the Government of Upper Canada, /
Who fell when gloriously engaging the Enemies / of his Country, /
at the head of the Flank Companies / of the 49th Regiment, /
in the Town of Queenstown, / on the morning of the 13th October, 1812, /
aged 42 years.
J.B. Glegg, A.D.C.

A 1929 lightning strike severely damaged Brock's statue, sending large portions crashing to the ground below.

In August 2003, the Friends of Fort George and Parks Canada held a ceremony to commemorate the 150th anniversary of the monument's groundbreaking. Engineering inspections carried out in 2003 and 2004 revealed the need for significant restorative work to the structure's interior and exterior limestone. Parks Canada closed the monument to the public in 2005 pending repairs. An extensive restoration on the monument began in 2008 and was completed in May 2009. Improvements included relining the interior walls to protect against condensation as well as battery-powered interior emergency lights to assist with exiting the monument should there be a power loss.

== Features ==
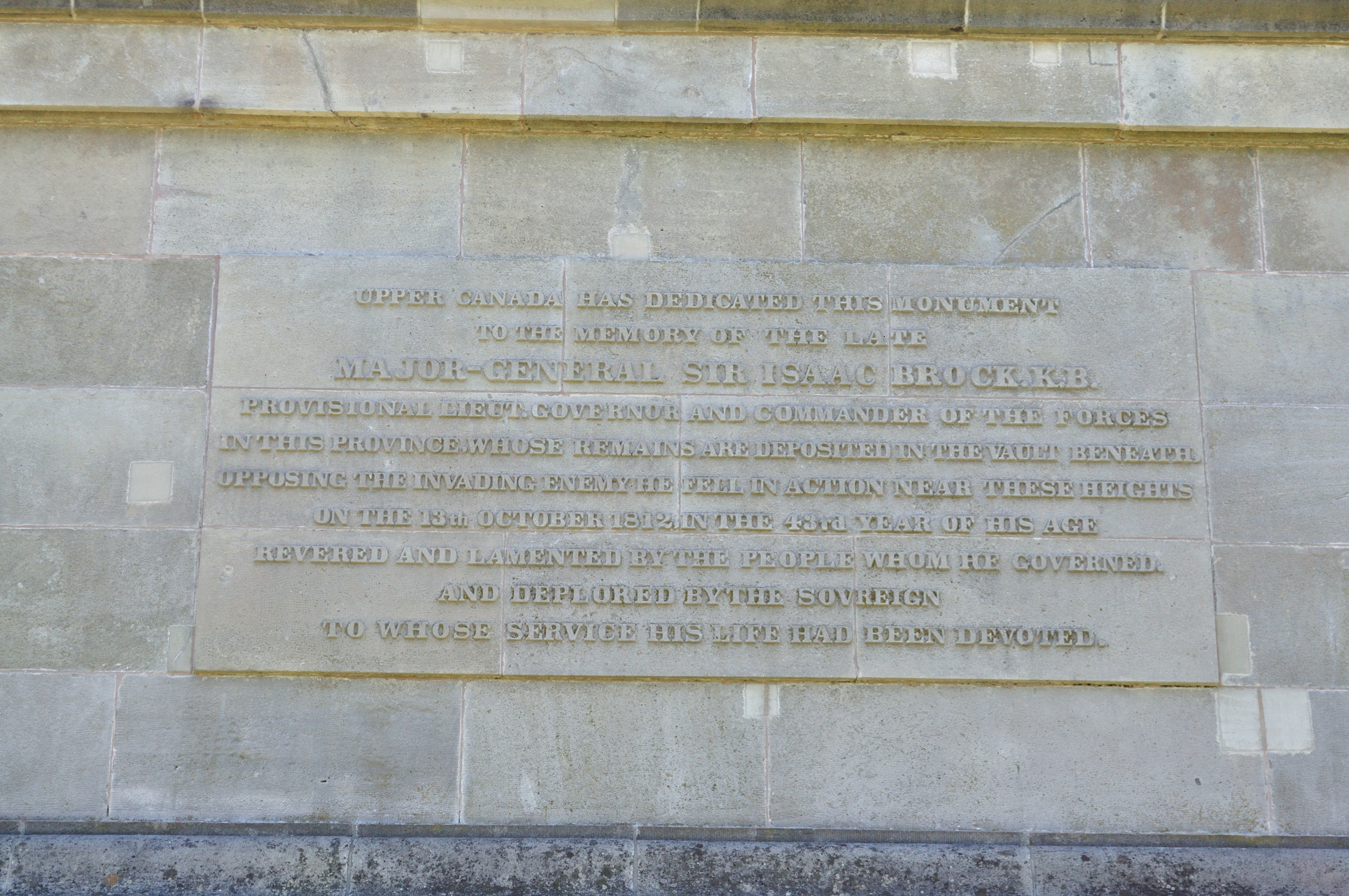
Brock's Monument Plaque 2015

The main entrance is flanked by two large mulberry trees believed to have been planted during the 1850s. Inside the monument's base are a number of brass plaques: Brock and Macdonell's epitaphs, a list of donors and builders, and a tribute to the British, Canadian, and First Nations soldiers who died at the Battle of Queenston Heights. The two bodies are interred in crypts within the limestone walls. More recent educational displays outline Brock's life, the battle, and the monument's history—including a portion of Brock's former limestone arm that collapsed in 1929.

A 235-step spiral staircase up the column leads visitors to a small indoor platform underneath Brock's statue. Porthole windows provide views of the surrounding Niagara region and Lake Ontario.

The monument, illuminated at night, marks the end of an interpretive historical walking trail that leads down and then up Queenston Heights, recounting key events in the battle.

There is also a small monument to Tecumseh between the monument and the look out. This monument is approximately 3 feet tall, and is composed of twigs, twine and dyed dollar store feathers. It has a placard made of paper protected by a report cover, and has been maintained for years, however, not by Parks Niagara, Parks Ontario, or Parks Canada, but by some caring civilians.

== Restoration ==
The Brock Monument has reopened to the public after extensive restoration, as weathering and exposure to the elements had caused damage over time, necessitating repairs. Parks Canada oversaw the restoration, which included repairing and re-grouting the mortar joints, replacing damaged stone components, and installing a lead roof to protect the structure from the elements. The federal government allocated $2.2 million for the restoration and site recovery project, with $1.1 million specifically for site recovery, helping to preserve the monument's historical value.

== See also ==
- Monarchy in Ontario
- Canadian war memorials
