= Isaac Brock =

British Army officer and colonial administrator (1769–1812)

Major-General Sir Isaac Brock KB
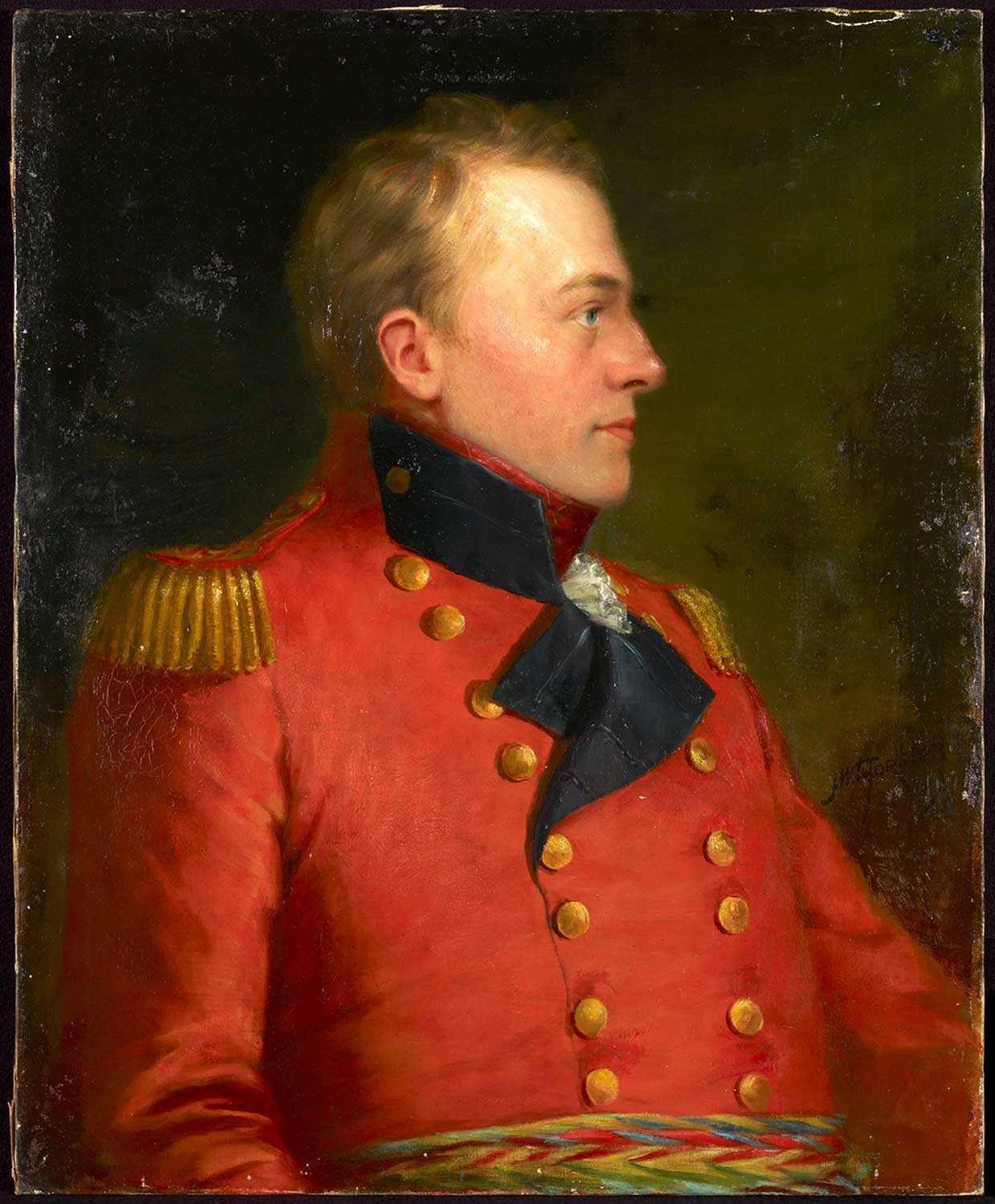
- 1897 portrait

Lieutenant Governor of Upper Canada
- Acting
- In office 1811 – 13 October 1812
- Monarch: George III
- Governor General: George Prevost
- Acting for: Francis Gore
- Succeeded by: Roger Hale Sheaffe

Personal details
- Born: 6 October 1769 Saint Peter Port, Guernsey
- Died: 13 October 1812 (aged 43) Queenston, Upper Canada
- Cause of death: Killed in action by a gunshot wound to the chest
- Resting place: Brock's Monument, Queenston
- Nickname: "The Hero of Upper Canada"

Military service
- Allegiance: Great Britain; United Kingdom
- Branch/service: British Army
- Years of service: 1785–1812
- Rank: Major general
- Unit: 8th Regiment of Foot
- Commands: 49th Regiment of Foot
- Battles/wars: French Revolutionary Wars; Battle of Alkmaar (1799); Battle of Copenhagen (1801); War of 1812; Siege of Detroit; Battle of Queenston Heights †
- Awards: Order of the Bath

Major-General Sir Isaac Brock (6 October 1769 – 13 October 1812) was a British Army officer and colonial administrator who served in the French Revolutionary Wars and War of 1812. Born in the Guernsey town of Saint Peter Port, Brock joined the British army as an ensign in the 8th (The King's) Regiment of Foot in 1785. He purchased a lieutenant's commission in 1790 and became a captain in the next year by raising a regimental company. Brock transferred to the 49th (Hertfordshire) Regiment of Foot in 1791 and travelled to Barbados to join his regiment. Contracting yellow fever in Jamaica in 1793, he returned to England to recuperate and oversaw recruitment efforts, being promoted to major in 1795 and lieutenant colonel in 1797.

Brock served with his regiment in the Anglo-Russian invasion of Holland in 1799 and the Battle of Copenhagen in 1801. He was sent with the rest of the regiment to Upper Canada as garrison troops in 1802. Despite facing desertions and near-mutinies Brock successfully commanded his regiment in Canada for several years. He was promoted to colonel in 1805 and again to brigadier general in 1808. In 1811 Brock was promoted again to major general and given responsibility for defending Upper Canada against the threat of an American invasion. While many in Canada and Britain believed war could be averted, Brock began to ready the British Army and Canadian Militia for the threatened invasion.

When the War of 1812 with the United States broke out in June of that year the British and Canadians were prepared and Brock joined forces with the Shawnee leader Tecumseh and captured Fort Detroit in August. Following the capture of Fort Detroit Brock moved to guard against a possible American invasion carried out by crossing the Niagara River. An American army invaded Canada near Queenston in October using the river, and Brock led a force of British and Canadian troops bolstered by Mohawk warriors to oppose the invasion. In the ensuing battle Brock's force defeated the Americans though he was killed while leading a counterattack. Brock's victories and collaboration with Tecumseh led him to be commemorated as "The Hero of Upper Canada".

== Early life ==
1680 illustration of Saint Peter Port, where Brock was born in 1769.

Brock was born at Saint Peter Port on the Channel Island of Guernsey. He was the eighth son of John Brock (1729–1777), a former midshipman in the Royal Navy. His mother was Elizabeth de Lisle, the daughter of Daniel de Lisle, the lieutenant-bailiff of Guernsey. The Brocks were an English family who had been established in Guernsey since the sixteenth century. Brock earned a reputation during his early education on Guernsey as an assiduous student, as well as an exceptional swimmer and boxer. At age eleven, he was sent to school in Southampton, and afterwards to Rotterdam where he became fluent in French.

Although his formal education ended when he was a teenager, Brock appreciated its importance. As an adult, he spent much time reading in order to broaden his knowledge. He read many works on military tactics and science, but also read ancient history and other less practical topics. At the time of his death, he owned a modest library of books, including classic works by Shakespeare, Voltaire, and Samuel Johnson.

Brock kept his reputation as an "unusually tall, robust" man throughout his life, with an adult height of about 6 ft 2 in (188 cm). Measurements taken from his uniform show that at his death he had a waist size of 47 inches (120 cm), while the inside brim of his hat measured 24 inches (61 cm) in circumference. Although Brock was noted as a handsome man who enjoyed the company of women, he never married.

== Military service ==
Brock had a successful pre-war military career and a quick rise through the ranks, which many commented on at the time. Some credited luck, and others skill, in his rapid promotions. Brock had substantial portions of both on his way to prominence. Lacking special political connections, his ability to gain promotions even when Britain was at peace attests to his ambition, and his skills in recruiting men and organizing finances.

=== Early career ===
Brock joined the British Army's 8th (The King's) Regiment of Foot on 8 March 1785 at the rank of ensign. As was common at the time, Brock's commission was purchased for him by his family. When Brock joined the 8th Foot the regiment's commanding officer was Lieutenant-colonel Arent De Peyster, who had served in North America during the American War of Independence as commandant of Fort Detroit and had substantial experience negotiating with Britain's Native American allies. On 16 January 1790 Brock purchased the rank of lieutenant and later that year raised his own company. As a result, he obtained a commission as captain of an independent company on 27 January 1791, and transferred to the 49th (Hertfordshire) Regiment of Foot on 15 June 1791.

At the time of Brock's transfer, the 49th Foot was stationed in Barbados in the British West Indies. His nephew and biographer, Ferdinand Brock Tupper, asserts that shortly after Brock arrived in Barbados, a "professional dueller" forced a match on him. As the one being challenged Brock had his choice of terms, and he insisted that they use pistols. His friends were shocked as Brock was a large target and his opponent an expert shot. Brock, however, refused to change his mind. When the duellist arrived at the field, he asked Brock to decide how many paces they would take. Brock insisted that the duel would take place not at the usual range, but at handkerchief distance (i.e., close range). The duellist declined and was subsequently forced out of the regiment. This contributed to Brock's popularity and reputation among his fellow officers, as this duellist had a formidable reputation and was regarded as a bully.

Several months after Brock's arrival, the regiment was ordered to the British colony of Jamaica. In 1793, Brock fell victim to yellow fever and became seriously ill. He did not fully recover until he returned home to Guernsey on leave. After regaining his strength, he became involved in recruiting efforts and the training of volunteer companies raised for home defence. Brock purchased a promotion to major on 27 June 1795. He rejoined the 49th Foot in the summer of 1796 when the regiment returned from the West Indies.

=== First command ===
Brock purchased the rank of lieutenant colonel for £3,000 in October 1797. He served as the acting commanding officer of the 49th Foot for several months, and officially assumed command of the regiment on 22 March 1798 with the retirement of Lieutenant Colonel Frederick Keppel.

In 1799, during the War of the Second Coalition, the 49th Foot was assigned to the Anglo-Russian expedition against the Batavian Republic. The 49th Foot were attached to Major General John Moore's 4th Brigade, part of the division commanded by Lieutenant General Sir Ralph Abercromby. The expedition faced minimal opposition when they landed at Callantsoog, south of Den Helder on 27 August. Brock first saw combat when the 49th Foot helped fend off a French attack on 10 September. On 19 September, the 4th Brigade captured Hoorn without a shot but withdrew from the city shortly thereafter.

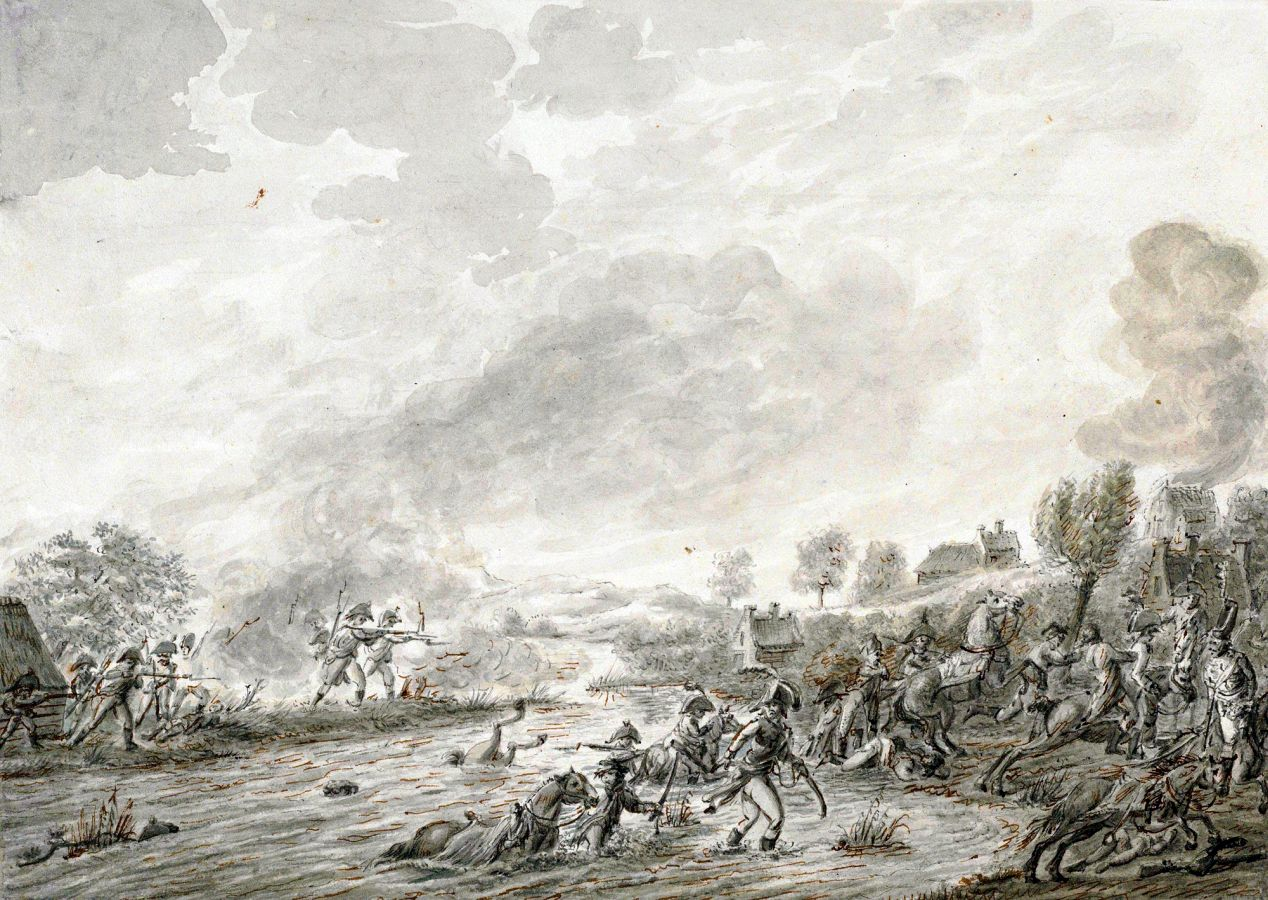
The Battle of Alkmaar, which Brock fought in

On 2 October, the 49th Foot was actively involved in heavy combat at the Battle of Alkmaar. During the battle, the 4th Brigade served as the vanguard of a column that steadily proceeded south along the beach from Petten towards Egmond aan Zee. As it advanced, the column was increasing harassed by French sharpshooters hiding in patches of thick scrub. Eventually, the French blocked the advance by taking up a strong position in the sand dunes overlooking the beach. Moore's brigade was ordered to dislodge the French from their position with a bayonet charge. In a letter to his brother Brock wrote that he "ordered a charge, which I assure you was executed with the greatest gallantry, though not in the greatest order, as the nature of the ground admitted of none."

The engagement continued for several hours until the French finally gave way and the British were able to push forward. By the end of the day the 49th Foot had suffered 33 killed including 2 officers, 56 wounded, and 24 missing. Brock himself was injured during the fighting when he was hit in the throat by a spent musket ball. His neck cloth prevented a possibly fatal injury. Brock wrote, "I got knocked down shortly after the enemy began to retreat, but never quitted the field, and returned to my duty in less than half an hour."

The 49th Foot returned to Great Britain at the end of October, and garrisoned Jersey for several months beginning in July 1800. Early in 1801, the regiment was chosen to act as marines for a naval expedition against Denmark. The 49th Foot was tasked with assaulting the forts at Copenhagen, however, the outcome of the naval battle made such action unnecessary. Brock sailed aboard the 74-gun HMS Ganges commanded by Captain Thomas Fremantle, with the rest of the regiment distributed on seven other ships. One of these ships, HMS Monarch, suffered the highest number of fatalities during the battle, including eight members of the 49th Foot.

=== Transfer to Canada ===
York in 1803, the same year Brock established his headquarters there

Brock and the 49th Foot were back in England by September 1801. The following spring they were ordered to the Canadas. Brock arrived at Quebec on 25 August and then headed up the St. Lawrence River to Montreal where the regiment would spend the winter. The following spring, the 49th Foot was assigned to garrison Fort York on Lake Ontario and Fort George on the Niagara River, as well as several smaller posts. Brock established his headquarters at York, the capital of Upper Canada.

In the summer of 1803, Brock was confronted with the desertion of several men, which was an ongoing problem at posts located close to the American border. Five men of the 49th Foot and three others had stolen a boat, fled across Lake Ontario, and landed near the mouth of the Niagara River. Despite having no jurisdiction on American soil, Brock set across the lake in pursuit. From Fort George he dispatched a party across the border and the fugitives were soon apprehended.

=== Mutiny ===
A short time later, Brock received a report from Fort George that some of the garrison were planning to confine their officers then cross over to the United States. Brock immediately boarded the schooner that had brought the message and headed to Fort George. According to Tupper, a hastily assembled honour guard formed to greet Brock's unexpected arrival. Alone on entering the fort, Brock ordered the sergeant of the guard to disarm and had him arrested. As it was the dinner hour, all the soldiers were in barracks. Brock ordered the drummers to call out the men. He ordered the first officer on the scene, Lieutenant Williams, to bring him a soldier suspected of being one of the mutiny's ringleaders. Ten other suspected mutineers were also taken prisoner.

Brock sent the twelve mutineers and the eight deserters to Quebec for court martial. Nine were transported for life and seven were sentenced to death. The mutineers testified that they were forced to such measures by the rigid discipline imposed by Lieutenant Colonel Roger Hale Sheaffe, who commanded at Fort George. They said if they had served under Brock's command, they would never have taken such action. Subsequently, Brock was ordered to move his headquarters to Fort George. In a letter to his brother, Brock expressed regret that the conspirators had been executed, as some had been men who had been with him in Holland and at Copenhagen.

=== Pre-war preparations ===
Brock went on leave to Guernsey in October 1805, and received a promotion to colonel that same month. When he arrived back in Canada in September 1806, he found himself in temporary command of all British forces in Upper and Lower Canada. Over the next six years, Anglo-American relations increasingly deteriorated over several areas of disputes, and American politicians began to call for war with Britain and an invasion of Canada. In response to this emerging threat, Brock moved quickly to bolster Canadian defences. He strengthened the fortifications of Quebec by reconstructing the city's western wall and creating an elevated artillery battery. He reorganized and strengthened the Provincial Marine, creating a naval force capable of giving the British command of the Great Lakes. Brock's appropriation of civilian land and labour for military use, however, brought him into conflict with civil authorities including Thomas Dunn, the Lieutenant Governor of Lower Canada.

Brock remained acting commander-in-chief of all British forces in Upper and Lower Canada until the arrival of Sir James Henry Craig, the newly appointed Governor General of British North America. In March 1808, Craig moved Brock to Montreal and appointed him a brigadier. Brock remained in Lower Canada until the summer of 1810 when he was given command of all British forces in Upper Canada. In June 1811 he was promoted to major general, and in October of that year was appointed administrator of Upper Canada when Francis Gore, the Lieutenant Governor, went to England on leave. Brock was now both the senior military officer in Upper Canada and the leader of its civil government.

As Upper Canada's administrator, Brock made a series of changes to prepare for war. He convinced the Legislative Assembly to amend the 1808 Militia Act to allow for the formation of flank companies for each militia battalion, which were to train for six days every month. He continued to strengthen Upper Canada's fortifications, and ensured that the militia was adequately equipped. He began seeking out Indigenous leaders, such as the Shawnee chief Tecumseh and the Mohawk chief John Norton, hoping to secure alliances in the event of war. Although conventional wisdom held that Upper Canada would fall quickly in the event of an invasion, Brock pursued these strategies to give the colony a fighting chance, however, his attempt to have the Legislative Assembly partially suspend habeas corpus failed.

In the years immediately prior to the War of 1812, Brock had occasionally petitioned for a posting to Spain or Portugal. In early 1812, when he was finally offered a position in Europe, Brock declined the offer, believing that he now had a duty to defend Upper Canada against the United States.

== War of 1812 ==
=== Mackinac and Detroit ===
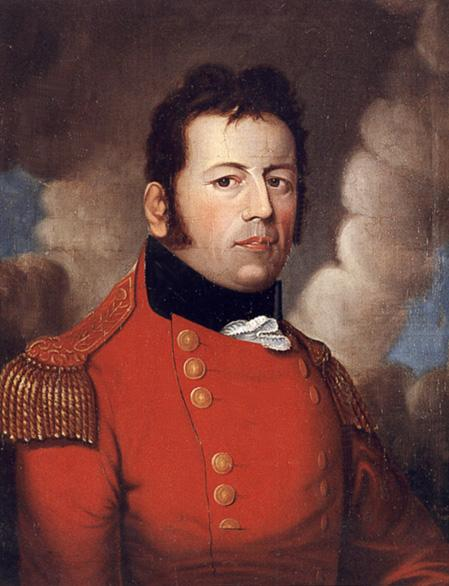
Governor General Sir George Prevost, whose approach to the war conflicted with Brock's

The United States declared war on Britain on 18 June 1812. Despite his preparations, Brock remained deeply concerned about his ability to defend Upper Canada. Besides the militia flank companies, he had at his disposal only one British regular infantry regiment, a company of the Royal Artillery, and detachments from the Royal Newfoundland Fencibles and the 10th Royal Veteran Battalion. These were dispersed among several widely separated posts. Brock's advantage was that the armed vessels of the Provincial Marine controlled the lakes, which allowed him to move troops rapidly between threatened points.

When news of the outbreak of war reached him, Brock dispatched noted voyageur and fur trader William McKay with orders for Captain Charles Roberts at the British outpost of St. Joseph Island on Lake Huron. Roberts was given the discretion to maintain a defensive posture or attack the nearby American outpost at Fort Mackinac. Roberts immediately launched an attack with a scratch force of regulars, fur traders and Indigenous warriors. The American garrison, unaware that war had been declared, were taken by surprise and surrendered on 17 July. This easy victory encouraged many Indigenous tribes in the Michigan Territory, who had previously been neutral or undecided, to give their support to the British. They hoped that by helping the British they could prevent American settlers from pushing further into their traditional territories.

Brock felt he needed to take further action but was hampered by Governor General Sir George Prevost, who had replaced Craig late in 1811. Prevost's orders from the British government, and his own inclinations, were to emphasize defence. Prevost kept the bulk of his forces in Lower Canada to protect Quebec, and opposed any attack into United States. In addition, Brock believed that he was handicapped by the inertia and defeatism of legislators, civil servants and the general public. In a letter to Edward Baynes, Prevost's adjutant-general, Brock wrote:

My situation is most critical, not from anything the enemy can do, but from the disposition of the people – The Population, believe me is essentially bad – A full belief possesses them that this Province must inevitably succumb – This Prepossession is fatal to every exertion – Legislators, Magistrates, Militia Officers, all, have imbibed the idea, and are so sluggish and indifferent in all their respective offices that the artful and active scoundrel is allowed to parade the Country without interruption, and commit all imaginable mischief... What a change an additional regiment would make in this part of the Province! Most of the people have lost all confidence – I however speak loud and look big.

On 12 July, an American army under Brigadier General William Hull crossed the Detroit River and occupied Sandwich (later known as Windsor). Hull failed to advance on Fort Amherstburg at the mouth of the river. With his supply line under attack by the Provincial Marine and Indigenous forces led by Tecumseh, he withdrew back to Detroit on 8 August. This gave Brock the excuse he needed to disregard Prevost's instructions. After finally obtaining support from the Legislative Assembly for his measures to defend Upper Canada, Brock prorogued parliament and set out on 6 August for Fort Amherstburg with 50 regulars of the 41st Foot and 150 volunteers from the York Militia (the "York Volunteers"). He was later joined by detachments of the Lincoln, Oxford and Norfolk militias, and by John Norton with 60 warriors from the Six Nations of the Grand River. Travelling in boats along the north shore of Lake Erie in inclement weather, Brock reached Fort Amherstburg on 13 August.

Brock met Tecumseh at Fort Amherstburg and quickly established a rapport with the Shawnee leader.

At Fort Amherstburg, Brock met Tecumseh, and was immediately impressed. Brock read the American dispatches and correspondence that Tecumseh had intercepted, and concluded that Hull was a timid commander and deathly afraid of the Indigenous warriors. He also learned that the American forces at Detroit were demoralized and short of rations. Against the advice of some of his officers, Brock immediately prepared to launch an attack on Detroit:

Some say that nothing could be more desperate than the measure, but I answer that the state of the Province admitted of nothing but desperate remedies. I got possession of the letters my antagonist addressed to the Secretary at War, and also of the sentiments which hundreds of his army uttered to their friends. Confidence in the General was gone, and evident despondency prevailed throughout. I have succeeded beyond expectation. I crossed the river contrary to the opinion of Cols. Procter, St. George etc.; it is therefore no wonder that envy should attribute to good fortune what in justice to my own discernment, I must say, proceeded from a cool calculation of the pours and contres.

Brock knew that he was outnumbered. Including the regulars from Fort Amherstburg and the Essex militia, Brock had a force of 330 regulars and 400 militia, as well as two Provincial Marine vessels, five field guns, and a few hundred Indigenous warriors. Meanwhile, Hull had close to 600 regulars, just over 1600 Ohio militia and numerous artillery pieces.

Brock relied on a number of tricks to intimidate Hull. On 15 August he sent his aide-de-camp, Captain John Glegg, under a flag of truce to Fort Detroit with a letter demanding Hull's immediate surrender. In the letter, Brock warned that he would not be able to restrain his Indigenous allies once the attack started:

It is far from my inclination to join in a war of extermination, but you must be aware that the numerous body of Indians who have attached themselves to my troops will be beyond my control the moment the contest commences.

Hull refused, replying, “I am prepared to meet any force which may be at your disposal.” Brock ordered the artillery he had positioned at Sandwich opposite Detroit to open fire. Hull returned fire without effect, and the guns of both sides fell silent as darkness fell. Tecumseh and his warriors crossed the river that night and moved through the woods north of the fort giving the impression of much larger numbers. Brock crossed shortly after sunrise with the regulars and militia. He had the militia wear cast-off red tunics supplied by the regulars, making it appear from a distance as if his force consisted entirely of professional soldiers. The artillery at Sandwich resumed their bombardment as Brock crossed the river, joined by the guns of the Provincial Marine vessels.

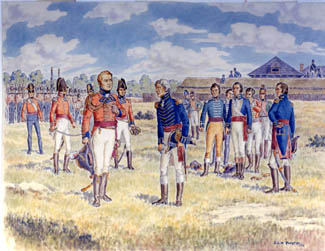
Hull surrendering Fort Detroit to Brock on 16 August

Following his initial refusal to surrender, Hull had become increasingly despondent. He was responsible not only for his soldiers but also for hundreds of civilians including his daughter and grandchildren. He lacked confidence in his men, believed he was outnumbered, and above all feared a massacre should he lose. Despite having a strong defensive position, Hull ordered his artillery not to return fire. After several officers were killed during the British bombardment, Hull decided that surrender was the only option.

Hull and his regulars were sent to Quebec as prisoners of the war, while the militia was paroled and sent home. Hull was later exchanged, but faced a court martial in January 1814, charged with treason, cowardice and neglect of duty. He is reported to have said: "I have done what my conscience directed — I have saved Detroit and the Territory from the horrors of an Indian massacre." Hull was found guilty and sentenced to death, but his sentence was commuted by President James Madison.

Hull's surrender was a "colossal disaster for the United States." The fall of Detroit damaged American morale and neutralized a significant threat to Upper Canada. At the same time, the victory boosted the morale of Upper Canada's regulars, militia and civilian population. Brock captured a considerable amount of supplies at Detroit including 2,500 muskets, 500 rifles, 33 artillery pieces and 69 barrels of gunpowder. Also taken were the colours of the 4th Infantry Regiment, and the armed brig Adams which was turned over to the Provincial Marine and renamed HMS Detroit. Under prize regulations, Brock was awarded £214 while each of his men was awarded at least £4.

The victory solidified the support of Tecumseh and other Indigenous leaders, who saw Brock's actions as both a sign of competence and a willingness to take action. Tecumseh trusted and respected Brock, and is reported to have proclaimed, "This is a man," after meeting the general for the first time. Although Brock's correspondence indicates a certain amount of paternal condescension for the First Nations, he seems to have regarded Tecumseh very highly saying, "a more sagacious or a more gallant warrior does not, I believe, exist". Brock made a number of commitments to the Shawnee leader. He promised not to broker a peace treaty with the Americans without addressing Tecumseh's vision of an independent homeland. There is no evidence Brock negotiated in bad faith. His personal integrity and respect for Indigenous peoples suggests that if he had lived he would have kept his word to the Shawnee leader.

Brock hoped to maintain momentum by crossing the Niagara River and capturing Fort Niagara, but was thwarted by the negotiation of an armistice between Prevost and American Major General Henry Dearborn. The armistice gave the Americans time to reinforce their positions along the river in preparation for an attack against Upper Canada later that year. Brock also received reinforcements: six companies of the 49th Foot, two companies of the Royal Newfoundland Fencibles, and 50 men of the 10th Royal Veterans.

News of Brock's victory reached the United Kingdom in early October and was published in the London Gazette on 6 Oct 1812. Four days later, the captured colors of the 4th Infantry Regiment were presented to the Prince Regent who appointed Brock an "Extra Knight of the Most Honourable Military Order of the Bath."

=== Death at the Battle of Queenston Heights ===
In mid-August, while Brock was at Detroit, Stephen Van Rensselaer arrived at Lewiston and took command of American forces along the Niagara River. Although he held the rank of major general in the New York state militia, Van Rensselaer had never commanded soldiers in battle. He had roughly 1,400 men under his command which he knew was not enough to launch a successful attack on Upper Canada. More regulars, militia and artillery arrived during the armistice which ended on 8 September. By the end of September, an additional 1,200 regulars were encamped at Black Rock. Canadian historian Robert Malcomson has calculated that at the time of the Battle of Queenston Heights, Van Rensselaer's army consisted of 2,484 regulars, 4,070 New York militia and 160 Pennsylvania militia. Meanwhile, Brock had 1230 regulars, 810 militia, and 300 Six Nations warriors to defend the 35 mile (56 km) border between Niagara and Fort Erie.

Van Rensselaer's forces began crossing the river at Queenston a few hours before dawn on October 13. The first wave landed on a gravel beach a few hundred meters south of the village. British sentries spotted the boats as they approached and opened fire before hastening to the village to spread the alarm. After landing, the Americans climbed the riverbank, formed a column and began advancing towards the village, but were met by a detachment of British regulars and militia led by Captain James Dennis of the 49th Foot. Following an intense firefight the Americans pulled back to the landing point and waited for reinforcements, while the British withdrew to the village. British artillery positioned in a redan halfway up the escarpment at Queenston, opened fire on the American embarkation point and on the boats crossing the river. In response, American artillery on the opposite side of the river attempted to silence the British guns.

At Niagara, Brock was awakened by the noise of the artillery. He thought the attack might only be a diversion but decided to ride to Queenston immediately, followed shortly afterwards by his aides, Lieutenant Colonel John Macdonell and Captain Glegg. At Brown's Point he encountered a detachment of the 3rd York preparing to march to Queenston and urged them onward. Brock continued galloping towards the village and arrived there shortly after dawn. He quickly realized that the attack was not a feint and dispatched a message to Major General Sheaffe at Fort George, ordering him to send reinforcements.

Following the arrival of the boats carrying the second wave, a detachment of regulars led by Captain John Wool headed upriver from the landing point and found a steep path that lead up the face of the escarpment. After climbing to the forested summit, they moved into position behind the redan. The British gun crews fled as soon as the Americans emerged from the trees. Several sources state that Brock had ridden up to the redan just before it was overrun. This claim, however, is based solely on secondhand accounts. Captain Wool's firsthand account, written just a few days after the battle, makes no mention of a senior British officer fleeing the scene.

c. 1908 illustration of Brock's death

Brock resolved to retake the redan without waiting for reinforcements. At the foot of the escarpment he assembled a body of men from the 49th Foot and from the flank companies of the 2nd York and 5th Lincoln. Placing himself at the head of the regulars, he led them up the slope in a frontal attack. Brock was struck in the wrist by a musket ball but continued upwards. His height, energetic gestures, and officer's uniform made him an obvious target. An American soldier stepped forward from a thicket and fired at the general from a range of barely 50 yards (46 m). The ball struck Brock in the chest, killing him almost instantly. While the British continued their attack, several men, supervised by Captain Glegg, carried Brock's body from the field and concealed it in a house in the village. Captain John Williams of the 49th then pulled everyone back into a forested area west of the redan where he was joined by Lieutenant Colonel Macdonell and the detachment of the 3rd York from Vrooman's Point.

Although he was lawyer by trade with little military experience, Lieutenant Colonel Macdonell led a second attempt, together with Williams, to retake the redan. The 49th and the militia charged forward and began pushing the Americans back. The battle's momentum turned when a musket ball hit Macdonell's mount, causing it to rear and twist around. A second shot hit Macdonell in the small of the back, causing him to fall from his horse. As the British attack faltered, the Americans pressed forward and took 21 prisoners. The retreating soldiers brought the mortally wounded Macdonell down to Queenston. Captain Dennis then ordered his regulars and the militia to abandon Queenston and regroup at Durham's Farm about one mile (1.6 km) north of the village. With the redan battery out of action, American reinforcements crossed the river unimpeded and move up to the heights.

According to popular legend, Brock's last words were "Push on, brave York Volunteers," however, the consensus among most historians and biographers is that the general died without saying a word. Forensic analysis of his uniform coat (now in the collection of the Canadian War Museum) and the eyewitness account of George Jarvis, support this theory.

Jarvis, a gentleman volunteer with the 49th Regiment, wrote that Brock:

...fell on his left side, within a few feet of where I stood. Running up to him I enquired, " Are you much hurt, Sir ?" He placed his hand on his breast and made no reply, and slowly sunk down.

The location of the gunshot hole in the coat indicates that the projectile likely passed through Brock's sternum and ruptured his aorta and pulmonary arteries. Death would have been almost instantaneous and Brock would have been incapable of saying anything. It is possible, however, that Brock did say "Push on, brave York Volunteers," or words to that effect, as he passed the 3rd York at Brown's Point.

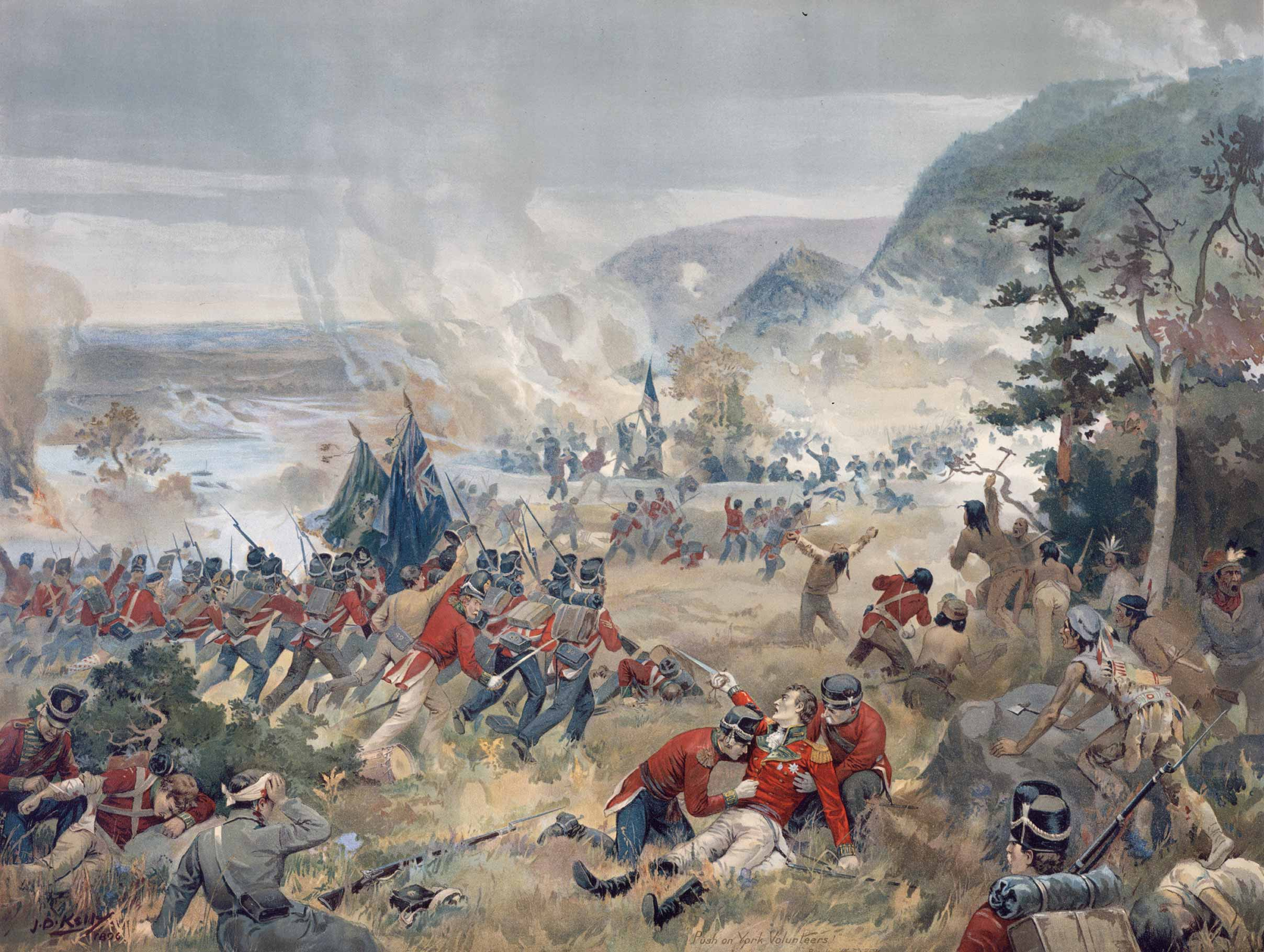
The Death of General Brock at the Battle of Queenston Heights by John David Kelly. The mortally wounded Brock is alleged to have shouted, "Push on, brave York volunteers!" before his death.

Major General Sheaffe arrived at Durham's Farm by mid-morning. He was followed closely by a detachment of the Royal Artillery and a company of the 41st Foot who proceeded to retake the village. Once the village was cleared, the artillery turned their fire against the boats ferrying troops across the river. Meanwhile, roughly 80 Six Nations warriors led by John Norton began harassing the American position on the heights.

Additional reinforcements continued to arrive at Durham's farm. Early in the afternoon, Sheaffe set out with about 650 men and marched across the fields to ascend the escarpment about a mile west of Queenston. His forces then circled around to south of the American position where they were joined by roughly 250 regulars and militia from Chippewa. Sheaffe positioned most of his regulars directly in front of the American line at a distance of about 400 yards (370 m), while two companies of regulars, supported by Runchey's Coloured Company and Norton's warriors, took up position to the west.

Just after 3:00 p.m, Sheaffe gave the order to advance. His regulars marched forward to within 100 yards (90 m) of the American line then volleyed en masse. The Americans volleyed in return then began to pull back. The British continued to advance, halting and firing as they did so, until they were exchanging point-blank fire with the retreating Americans. Many panicked when Norton's warriors swept in from the west. Some made an orderly retreat towards the landing place, however, there were no longer any boats to ferry them across to safety. Others fell to the deaths trying to climb down the cliff or drowned trying to swim the river. Roughly an hour after the attack began, the Americans surrendered. More than 950 were taken prisoner.

=== Burial ===
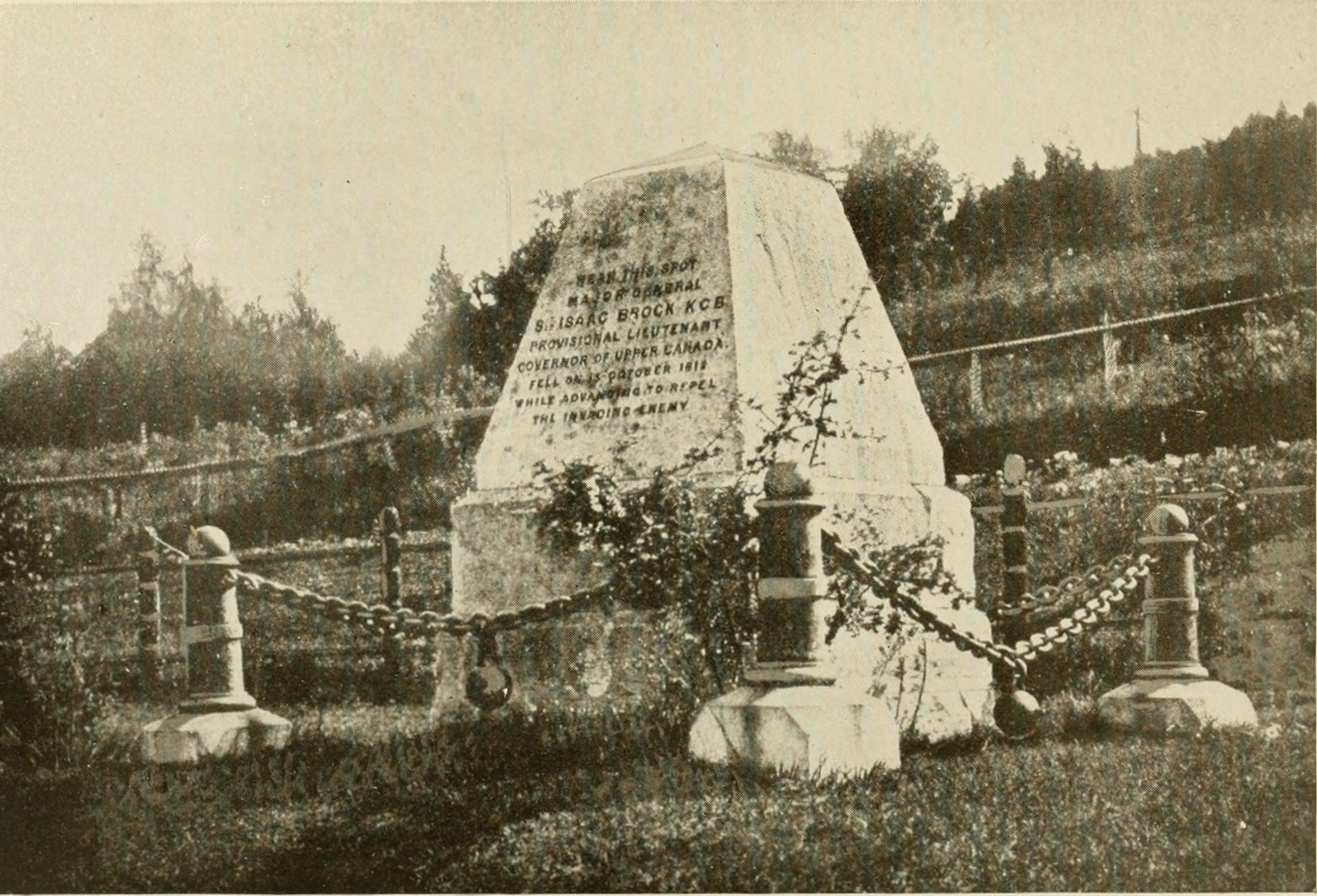
The cenotaph, Queenston Heights, erected near the spot where Brock fell

Sheaffe entrusted the funeral arrangements to Captain Glegg, who had served with Brock for many years. Brock's body was taken to Government House in Niagara. On 16 October, a funeral procession for Brock and Macdonell departed Government House for Fort George, with soldiers from the British Army, Upper Canada's militia, and Indigenous warriors lining the route. As the caskets were lowered into freshly dug graves in Fort George's northeast bastion, the garrison fired a twenty-one gun salute. Later that day, the American garrison at Fort Niagara fired a salute in tribute. An estimated five thousand people including military personnel attended the funeral, a remarkable number given the limited population of Upper Canada at that time.

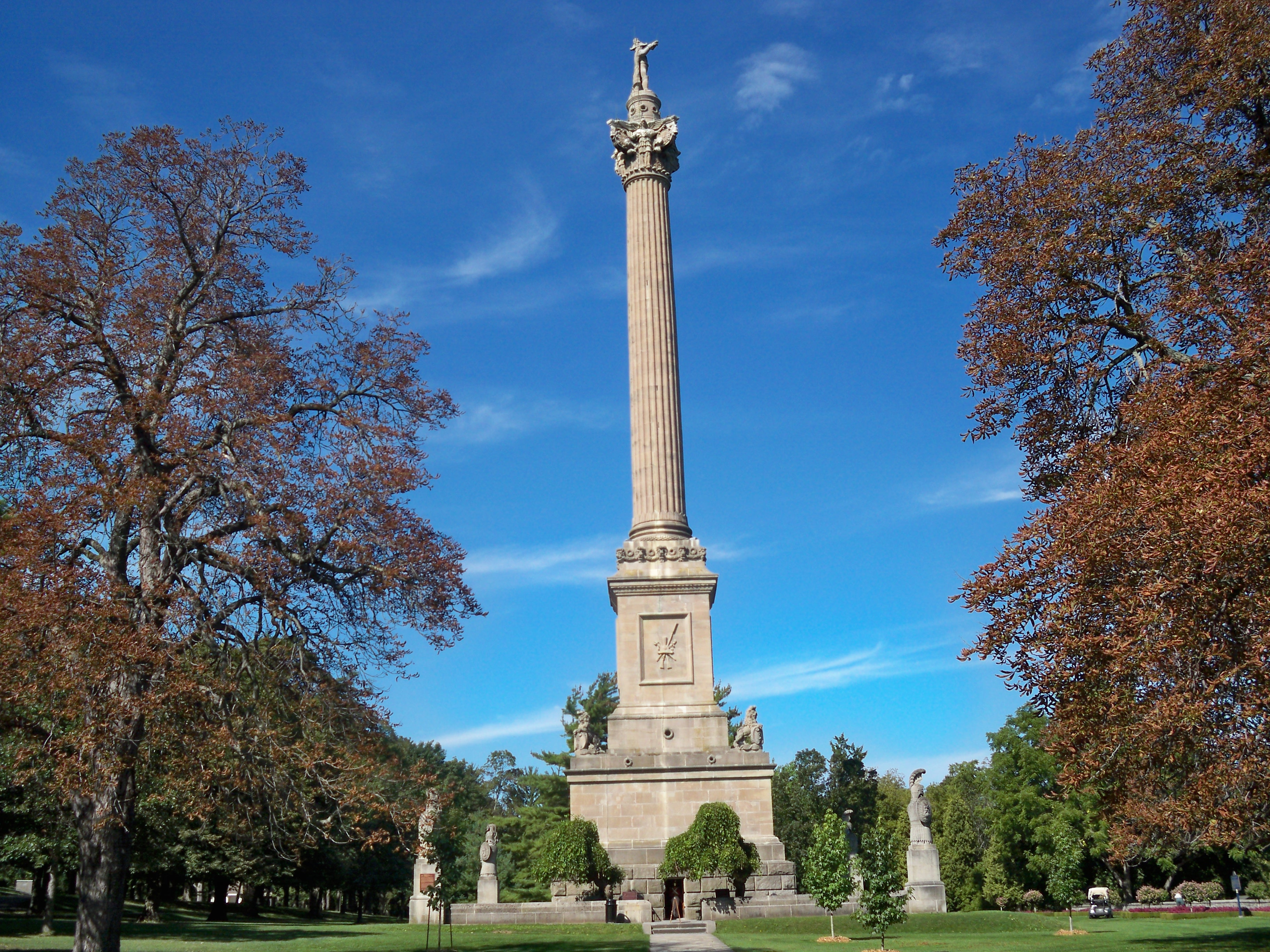
Brock's remains are interred at Brock's Monument, in Queenston, Ontario.

A small cairn near Queenston marks the spot where Brock is thought to have fallen. In 1824, Brock's and Macdonell's remains were moved to a newly constructed monument atop Queenston Heights. Brock's Monument was bombed and heavily damaged in 1840. This action was reputedly by Irish-Canadian terrorist Benjamin Lett, however, a subsequent assize failed to confirm this. The destroyed monument was replaced by a larger structure 185 feet (56 m) high, built at public expense, that still stands. Brock's and Macdonell's remains were reinterred inside the new monument on 13 October 1853. An inscription reads:

"Upper Canada has dedicated this monument to the memory of the late Major-General Isaac Brock, K.B. provisional lieutenant-governor and commander of the forces in the province whose remains are deposited in the vault beneath. Opposing the invading enemy he fell in action near these heights on 13 October 1812, in the forty-third year of his age. Revered and lamented by the people whom he governed and deplored by the sovereign to whose services his life had been devoted."

== Legacy ==
=== On British leadership ===
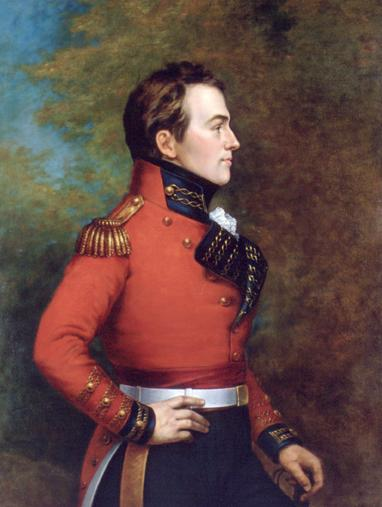
c. 1883 portrait of Brock by George Theodore Berthon

British military leadership, which had been decisive up to Brock's death, suffered a blow with his loss. Brock's direct successor, Major-General Sheaffe, although successful in his approach at Queenston Heights, was never able to live up to Brock's reputation. He was criticized by many, including influential clergyman John Strachan, for his retreat at the Battle of York in April 1813. Sheaffe was shortly afterwards recalled to England, where he continued a successful, if not brilliant, military career.

In 1813, Brock's successor at Detroit, Colonel Henry Procter, faced an attack from the reconstituted Army of the Northwest under Brigadier General William Henry Harrison. Harrison set out to retake Detroit, but the column led by his second-in-command, Brigadier General James Winchester, was defeated at the Battle of Frenchtown on 22 January 1813. Procter, displaying poor judgement, left several dozen wounded prisoners behind when the British withdrew. The prisoners were subsequently massacred by some of Procter's Indigenous allies. Following the American naval victory at the Battle of Lake Erie on 10 September 1813, Procter's supply lines were cut, and he and Tecumseh were forced to hastily retreat from Detroit and Amherstburg. Harrison caught up with Procter near Moraviantown on the Thames River, leading to the Battle of the Thames on 5 October 1813. Following a frontal attack by mounted riflemen the British retreated in disorder. Procter and about 246 of his men escaped while the rest of his soldiers surrendered. Tecumseh continued fighting but was fatally wounded. Procter was later court-martialed and reprimanded. He returned to England in 1815 and lived in semi-retirement until his death in 1822.

Lieutenant General Sir George Prevost, who often clashed with Brock, remained in control of British forces in North America until the end of the war, but was relieved of command immediately afterwards in consequence of his conduct during the September 1814 Battle of Plattsburgh. The battle was intended to be a joint naval and infantry attack, but Prevost failed to commit his land forces until the naval battle was nearly over. When he finally did advance, his forces were unable to cross the Saranac River bridge. Despite a heavy advantage in manpower, Prevost retreated upon hearing of the failure of the naval attack. Prevost was later recalled to England to face an inquiry. It was determined that the blame for the loss primarily rested with Prevost. Prevost's health failed him, and he died in early 1816.

=== In Britain ===
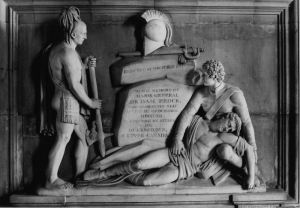
Memorial for Brock at St. Paul's Cathedral.

Although Brock's achievements in Canada were overshadowed by the fighting in Europe, his death was still widely noted, particularly in Guernsey. In London, he is remembered at a memorial in St Paul's Cathedral. The House of Commons voted £1575 to pay for the memorial, and also granted pensions of £200 to each of Brock's four surviving brothers. As a mark of esteem, the Prince Regent made a special grant to allow the heraldic supporters that would have been incorporated into Brock's coat of arms had he lived, to be included into the arms of Brock's father's descendants, and on monuments raised in Brock's memory.

A British naval vessel was named in his honour, HMS Sir Isaac Brock, but was destroyed at the Battle of York while under construction to prevent it falling into enemy hands. A regimental depot for the 49th Regiment of Foot (later the Royal Berkshire Regiment), was established at Reading in the late 1870s and was formally named Brock Barracks in 1934. It is now used as a cadet and reserve infantry training centre.

=== In Canada ===
Canadians regard Brock as one of their greatest military heroes. On the 2004 television show The Greatest Canadian Brock was voted 28th even though he was not born or naturalized as a Canadian.

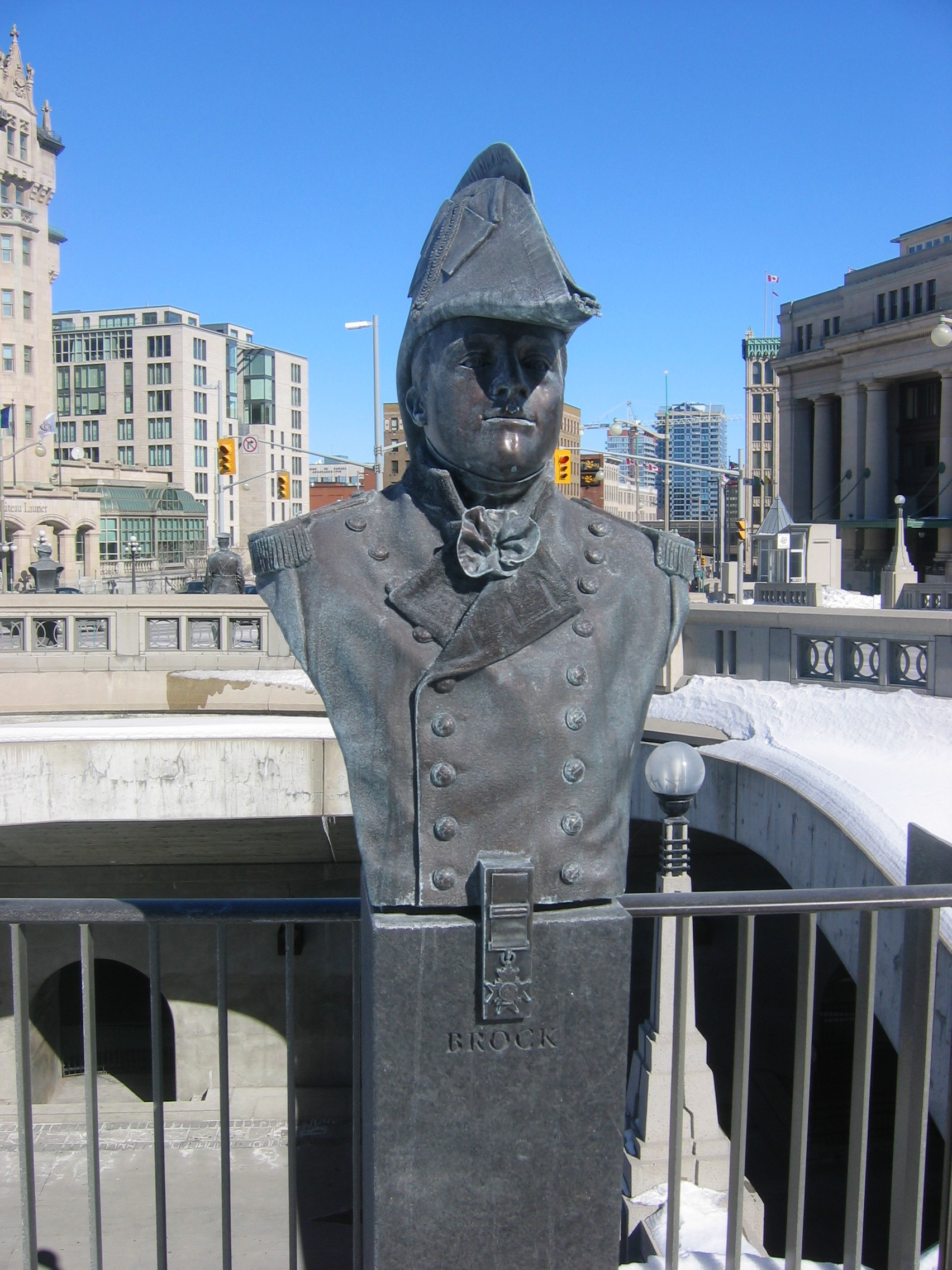
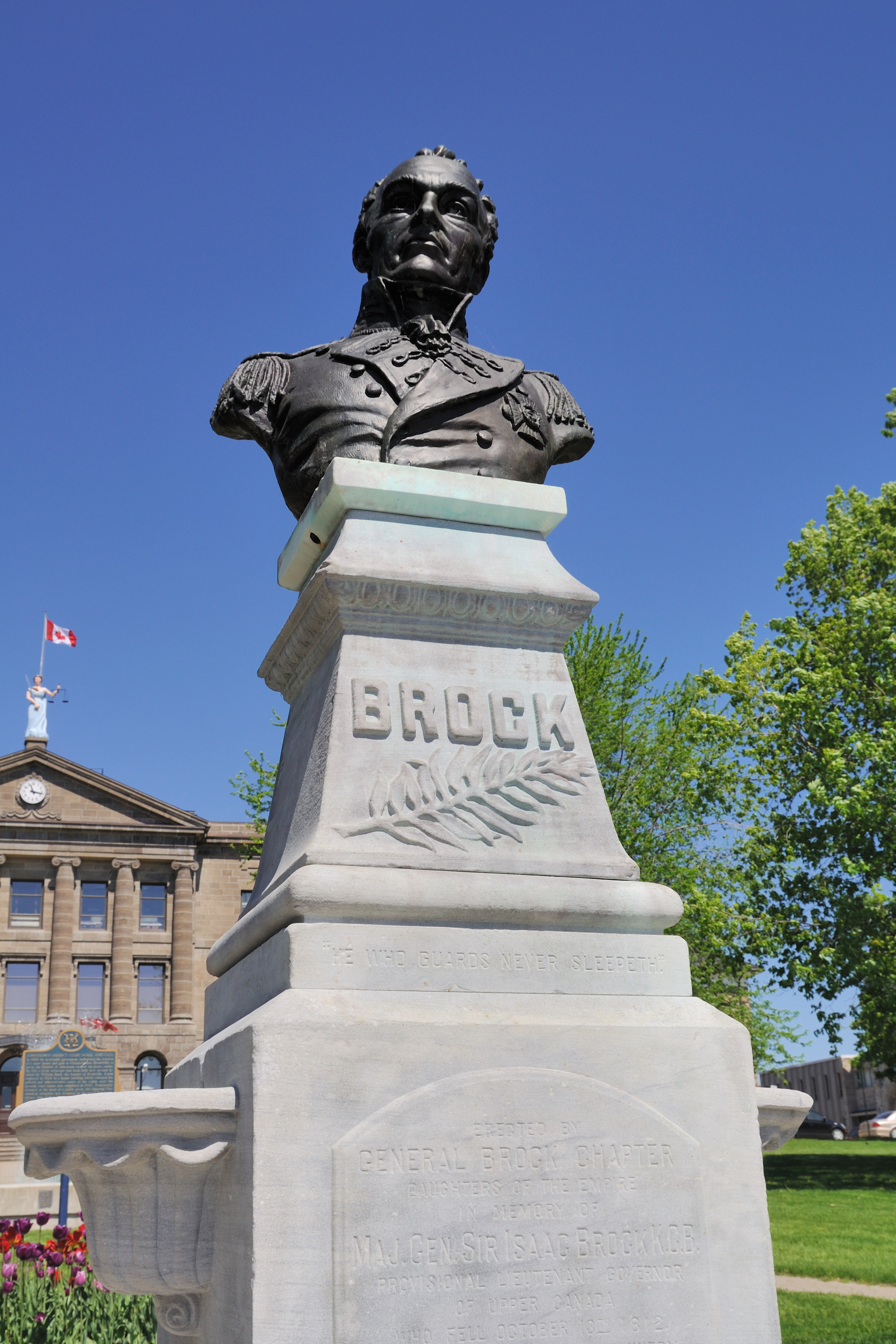
Busts of Isaac Brock at Valiants Memorial in Ottawa (left), and in Brockville, Ontario (right).

Although many Canadians have come to view Brock as one of their own, Brock never really felt at home in Canada. On the whole, he viewed the country as a backwater, and earnestly wished to return to Europe to fight against Napoleon. Brock initially mistrusted the inhabitants of Upper Canada, many of whom he suspected of being American sympathizers, and he was reluctant to arm them indiscriminately to help defend the colonies. He instead favoured expansion of volunteer forces which could be trained and supervised.

Since his death, several legends and myths about Brock have arisen. In 1908, the story of Brock's betrothal to Sophia Shaw, the daughter of Major General Æneas Shaw, was first published. There is no supporting evidence for the claim and most biographers consider it apocryphal. A legend about Brock's horse, Alfred, appeared many years after Brock's death. The horse was said to have been shot and killed during the battle while being ridden by Macdonell, and as such is commemorated in a monument erected in 1976 in Queenston near the cairn marking the spot where Brock fell. There is little evidence, however, to support this account. Alfred, "fully caparisoned and led by four grooms," is recorded as preceding the coffin at Brock's interment at Fort George.

In 1816, an unknown company issued a series of half-penny tokens honouring Brock with the title "The Hero of Upper Canada". Privately minted copper tokens became common in Canada due to initial distrust of "army bills", paper notes issued by Brock when there was a currency shortage caused by economic growth.

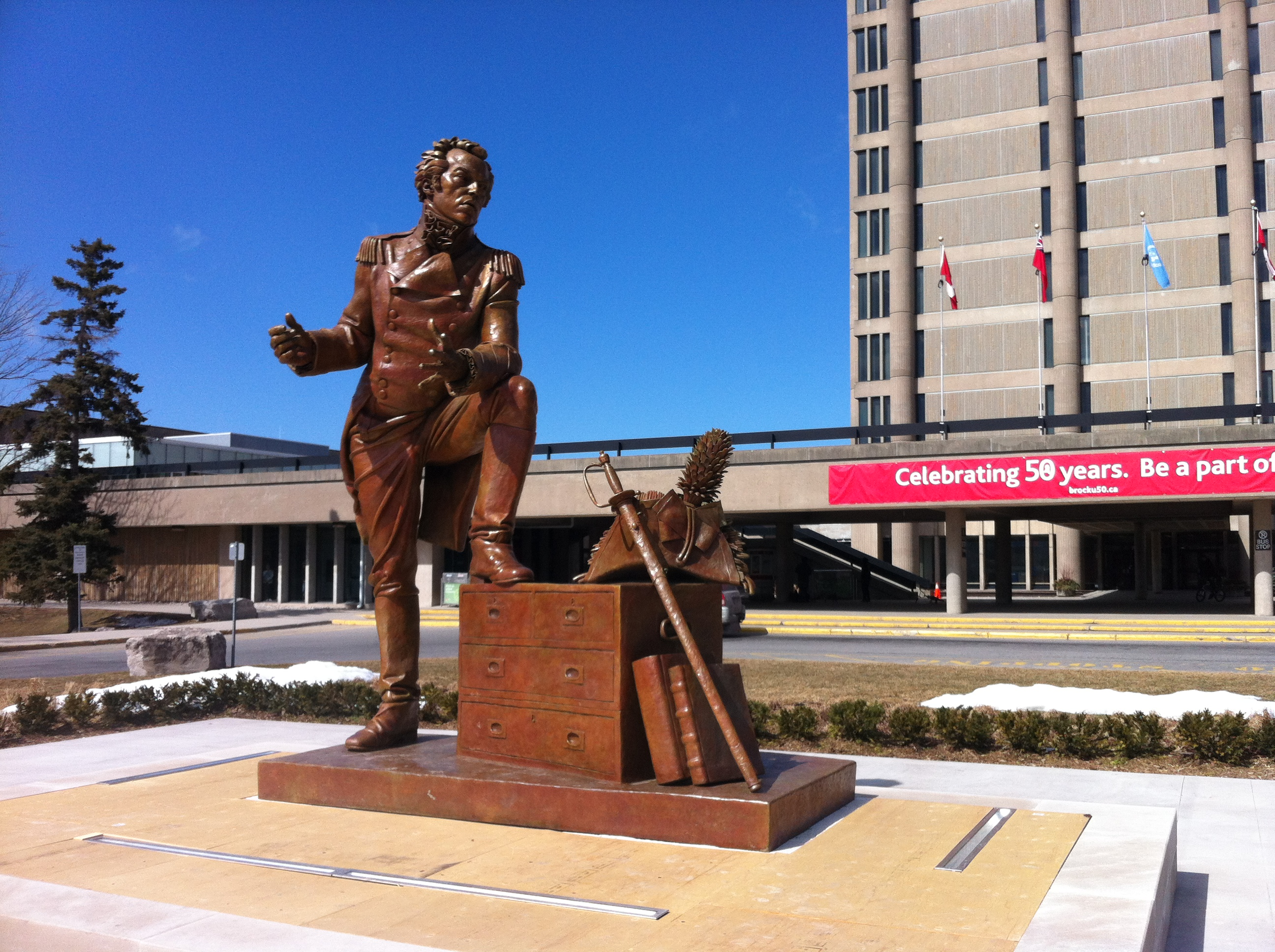
Statue of Isaac Brock at Brock University, a post-secondary institution named after the general

The city of Brockville and the township of Brock in Ontario, the village of Brock in Saskatchewan, the General Isaac Brock Parkway, and Brock University are all named in tribute to Brock. Schools named in his honour include one in Winnipeg, and public schools in Toronto, Guelph, Hamilton, London, Vancouver, and Windsor. The section of Spadina Avenue south of Queen Street in Toronto was once named Brock Street in his memory. The Toronto's Bathurst Street Bridge was renamed the Sir Isaac Brock Bridge in 2007 at the suggestion of the Friends of Fort York.

In 2006, a bust of Brock was one of the fourteen statues and busts dedicated at the Valiants Memorial in Ottawa.

A bronze life-sized statue of Brock and Tecumseh, located in the centre of Windsor's Sandwich Towne Roundabout, was unveiled on 7 September 2018. The statue depicts Brock examining Detroit through a spyglass while Tecumseh, mounted on horseback, is watching the British battery bombard the fort. The statue commemorates the partnership between the two leaders which resulted in the capture of Detroit, and was sculpted by Canadian artist Mark Williams.

Canada Post issued stamps commemorating Brock in 1969 and again in 2012. In September 2012, the Royal Canadian Mint issued a 99.999% pure gold coin with a face value of $350 Canadian in recognition of the bicentenary of Brock's death. The reverse design was taken from the half-penny token privately issued in 1816. The mint also issued a series of four 25 cent coins depicting Isaac Brock, Tecumseh, Laura Secord and Charles-Michel de Salaberry.

=== In Guernsey ===
Brock's childhood home on High Street in Saint Peter Port still stands, and is marked with a memorial plaque. A memorial, paid for by the Government of Canada, is fitted into the side of the Town Church, the parish church of Saint Peter Port.

He was posthumously awarded a large Army Gold Medal for his service at Fort Detroit, which is on display at the Saint Peter Port museum.

Brock University in Canada annually provides one undergraduate scholarship to a Guernsey student. In 1969, and again in 2012, the Guernsey Post Office issued postage stamps to commemorate Brock's life and achievements.

== Citations ==
Government offices
Preceded by Francis Gore	Lieutenant Governor of Upper Canada; 1811 to 1812	Succeeded by Roger Hale Sheaffe
