= Thomas Curtis Clarke =

American engineer (1827–1901)

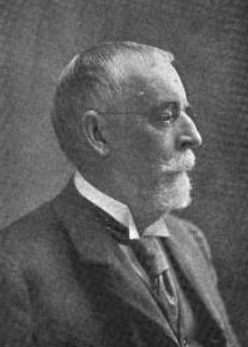
- Born: September 16, 1827; Newton, Massachusetts, U.S.
- Died: June 15, 1901 (aged 73); New York, New York, U.S.
- Education: Harvard University
- Occupations: Civil engineer, writer

Thomas Curtis Clarke (September 16, 1827 – June 15, 1901) was an American railway engineer, builder and author best known for a series of cast iron bridges in the United States. While living and working in Port Hope, Ontario, his firm won the contract to build the east and west blocks of the Canadian Houses of Parliament.

== Life ==
Clarke was born in Newton, Massachusetts on September 16, 1827 and as a boy he attended the Boston Latin School. He enrolled at Harvard University, graduating in 1848 with a Bachelor of Arts degree in engineering, working under Captain John Child.

In 1873, Clarke was elected as a member to the American Philosophical Society.

Thomas Curtis Clarke died in New York City on June 15, 1901, and is buried in Port Hope, Ontario, Canada.

The world of today differs from that of Napoleon Bonaparte more than his world differed from that of Julius Caesar, and this change has chiefly been made by engineering.

— Thomas Curtis Clarke
