= Queenston =

- Community
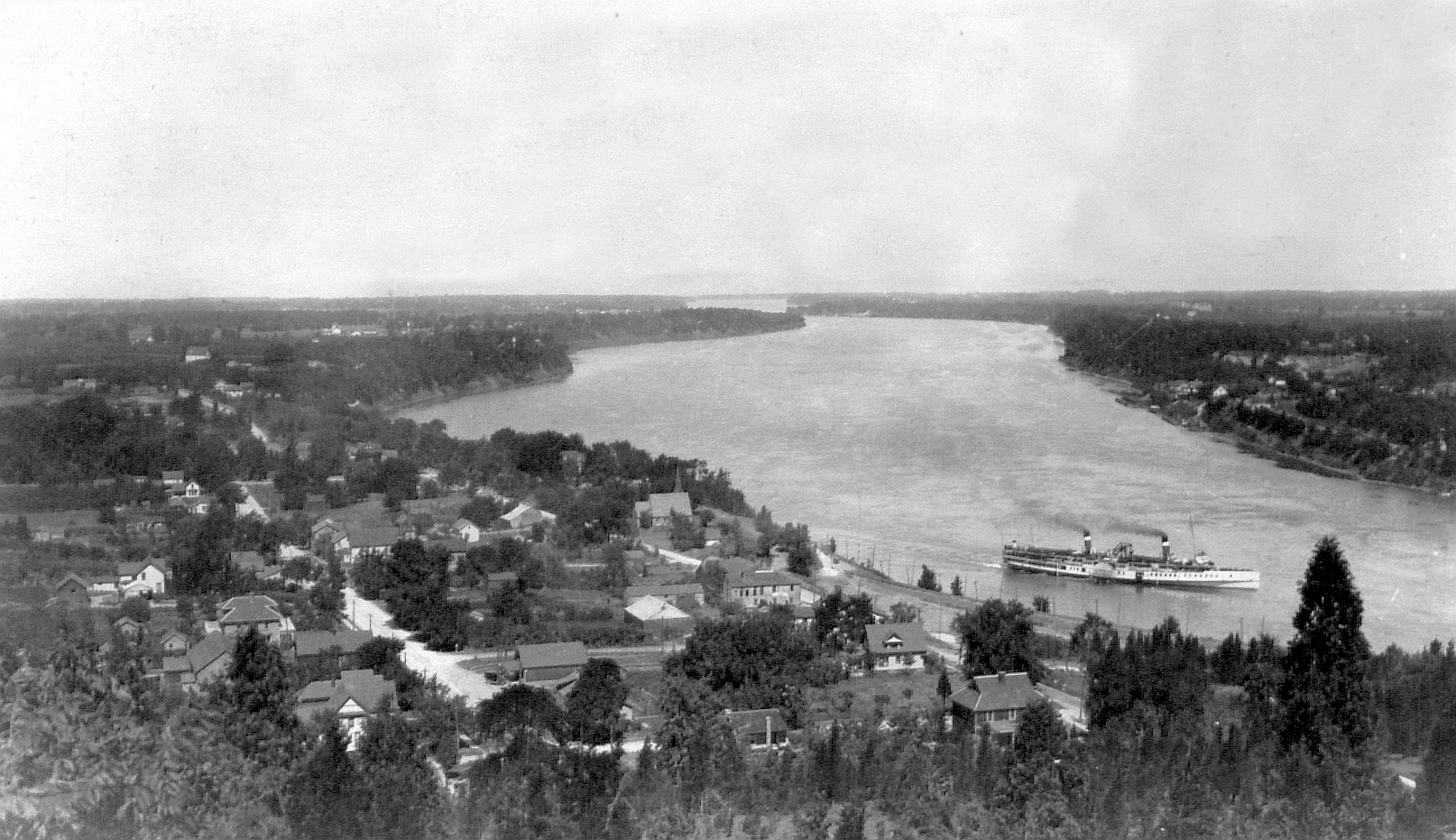
- Queenston, 1921

- Location in southern Ontario
- Coordinates: 43°9′51″N 79°3′16″W
- Country: Canada
- Province: Ontario
- Regional municipality: Niagara
- Town: Niagara-on-the-Lake
- Settled: 1770s
- Time zone: UTC-5 (EST)
  - Summer (DST): UTC-4 (EDT)
- Forward sortation area: L0S
- Area codes: 905, 289, 365
- NTS Map: 30M3 Niagara
- GNBC Code: FCJBN

Queenston is a compact rural community and unincorporated place 5 kilometres (3.1 mi) north of Niagara Falls in the Town of Niagara-on-the-Lake, Ontario, Canada. It is bordered by Highway 405 to the south and the Niagara River to the east; its location at the eponymous Queenston Heights on the Niagara Escarpment led to the establishment of the Queenston Quarry in the area. Across the river and the Canada–US border is the village of Lewiston, New York. The Lewiston-Queenston Bridge links the two communities. This village is at the point where the Niagara River began eroding the Niagara Escarpment. During the ensuing 12,000 years, the falls cut an 11-kilometre-long (6.8 mi) gorge in the escarpment southward to its present-day position.

In the early 19th century, the community's name was spelled as Queenstown.

Queenston marks the southern terminus of the Bruce Trail. The cairn marking the trail's terminus is in a parking lot, about 160 metres (520 ft) from General Brock's Monument on the easterly side of the monument's park grounds.

== History ==
Queenston was first settled in the 1770s by Loyalist refugees and immigrants from the United States. By 1807, the village had 100 homes and a population of 300.

Queenston was chosen as the northern terminus for a new portage around Niagara Falls developed in the 1780s in response to the loss of the Niagara Portage in the War of American Independence. Wharves, storehouses and a block-house were built. Initially called Lower Landing, it was named Queenston by Lieut.-Governor Simcoe.

In 1793, a young black woman named Chloe Cooley was sold as a slave and forced across the Niagara River into the United States, an event witnessed by several Queenston locals. This incident became a catalyst for the passage of the Act Against Slavery in 1793 by the Upper Canada Executive Council, marking a significant step towards the abolition of slavery in the region. Despite charges against Cooley's owner being dropped, the public outrage surrounding the event led Lieutenant-Governor Simcoe to push for legislation prohibiting the importation of slaves, resulting in the gradual abolition of slavery in Upper Canada. Today, Cooley's legacy is commemorated with markers and recognition, including her designation as a National Historic Person, illustrating Queenston's role in this pivotal moment in Canada's history.

A great deal of fighting occurred here during the War of 1812, in the settlement and at nearby Fort George. In that era, Laura Secord lived in this area. Rebel William Lyon Mackenzie lived in Queenston in the 1820s and operated his publishing operation here.

On 13 October 1812, American troops took possession of Queenston Heights. Major-General Sir Isaac Brock arrived from Fort George, Ontario with a small force and was killed while trying to regain the heights. The British, Mohawk and militia troops under Major-General Roger Hale Sheaffe, with reinforcements from Chippawa, Ontario were able to take the hill and captured nearly 1000 prisoners. The victory and Brock's death are commemorated by Brock's Monument atop the Niagara Escarpment with a large stone statue of Brock overlooking the village below. Nearby is a smaller monument to Brock's gray horse, Alfred, which may, or may not, have been at Queenston during the battle. Queenston Heights is one of the National Historic Sites of Canada, so recognized in June 1968.

The settlement of Queenston was destroyed on 10 December 1813. British Captain William Hamilton Merritt later said that he saw "nothing but heaps of coals, and the streets full of furniture".

In the 1830s, Queenston was the terminus for a first horse-drawn railway, the Erie and Ontario. The subsequent steam railroad that started in around 1854 bypassed Queenston.

In nearby St. David's, the Queenston Quarry was founded in 1837, and for 150 years stone was shipped here to help build many of Ontario's cities. Toronto buildings that benefitted from the supply of stone included Queen's Park, the Royal Ontario Museum, Union Station and the Gibraltar Point Lighthouse.

By the mid-1800s, the Welland Canal became the primary method of shipping goods and the village of Queenston received little trade.

Queenston became part of the town of Niagara-on-the-Lake in 1970.

RiverBrink Art Museum is located in Queenston. It is home to a unique collection of over 1,400 artworks and artefacts by Canadian and international artists, assembled by Samuel E. Weir. Completed in 1970, the building features Georgian-style architecture, including a mansard roof and gabled windows. It served as Weir's country residence, and was converted into an art museum following his death in 1981.

== See also ==
- Laura Secord Legacy Trail
- Royal eponyms in Canada

== Gallery ==
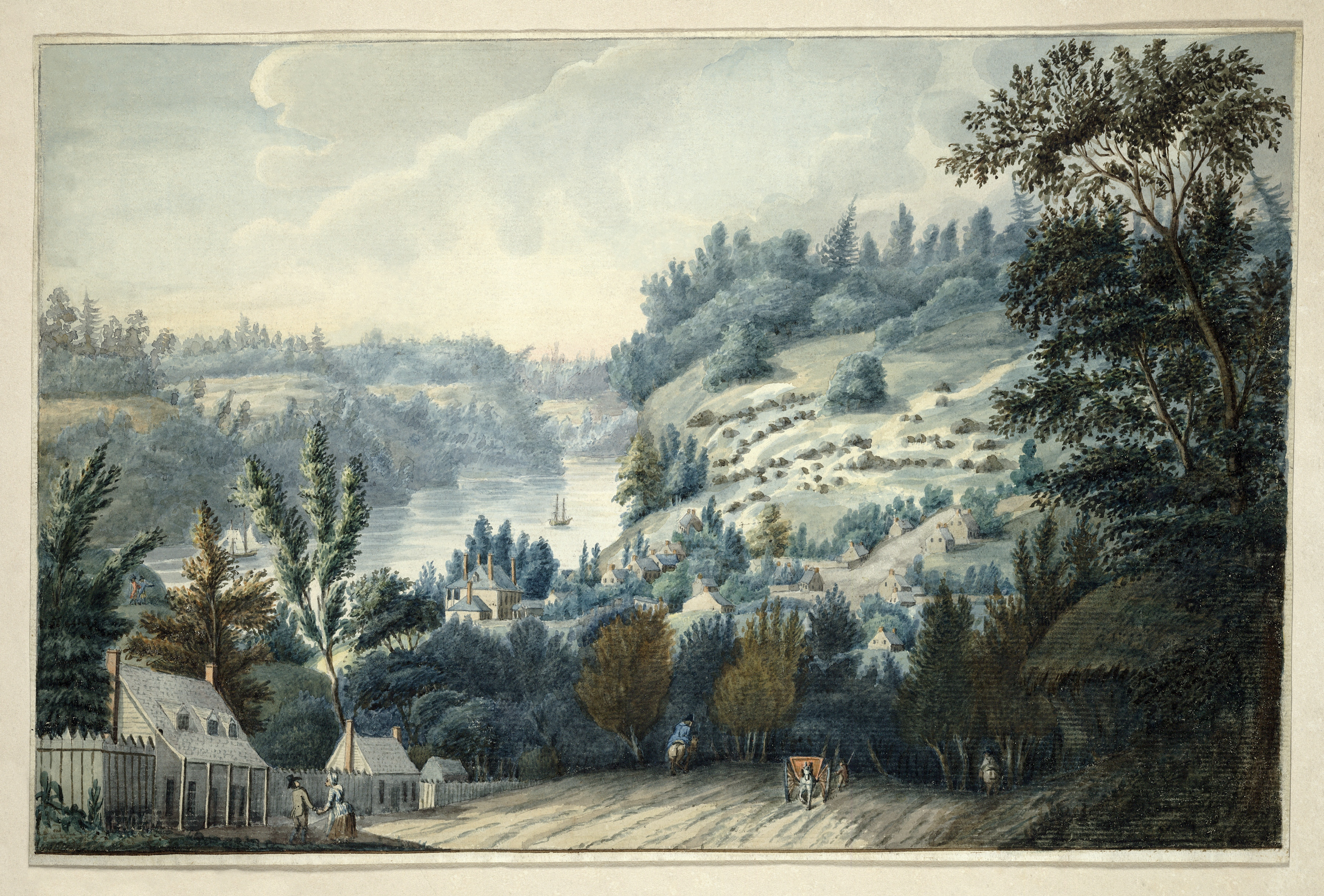
"Queenstown, Upper Canada on the Niagara, by Edward Walsh, circa 1803-1807

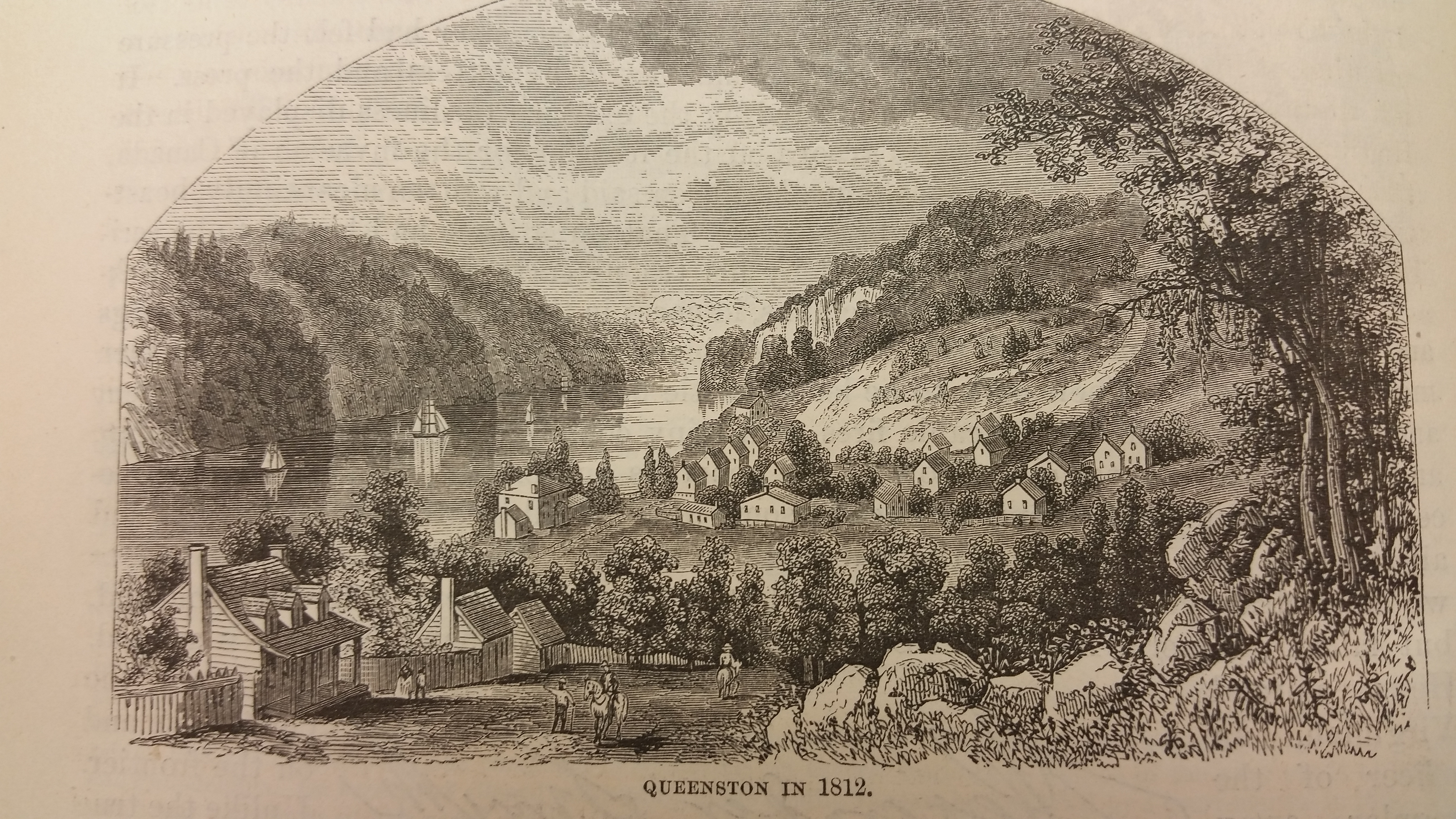
Queenston, 1812

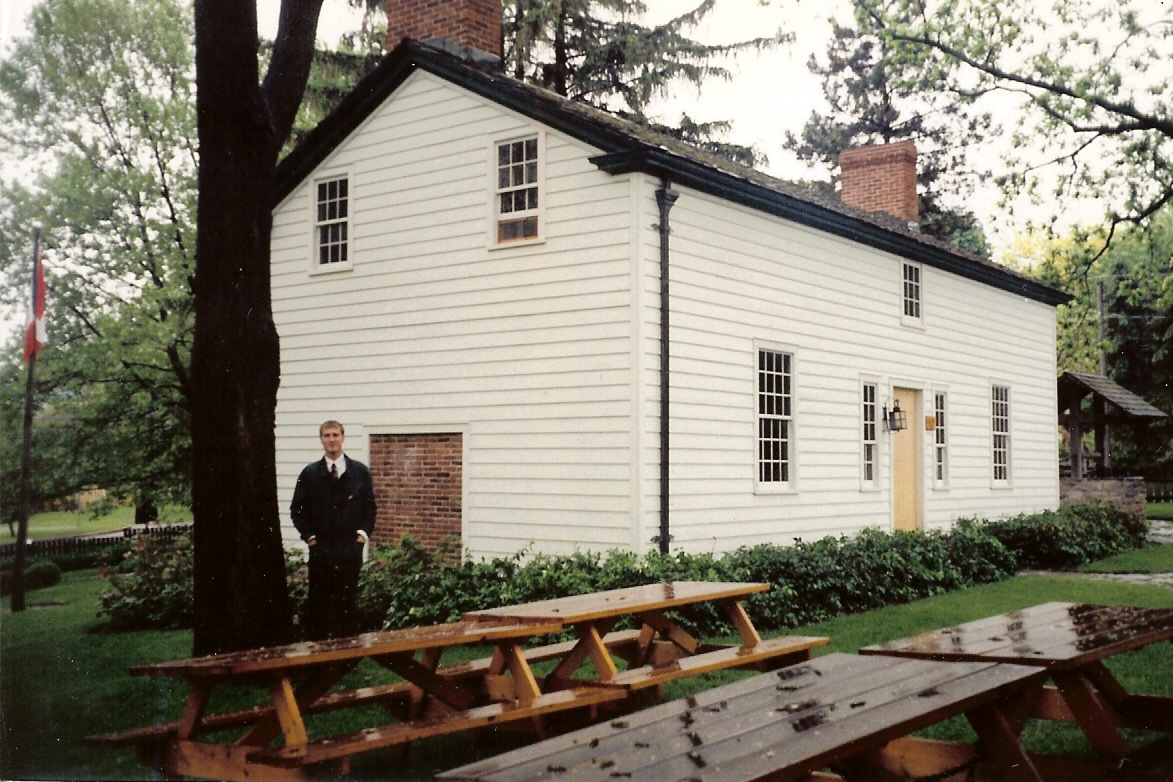
Laura Secord Homestead, Niagara-on-the-Lake, Ontario, c. 1803

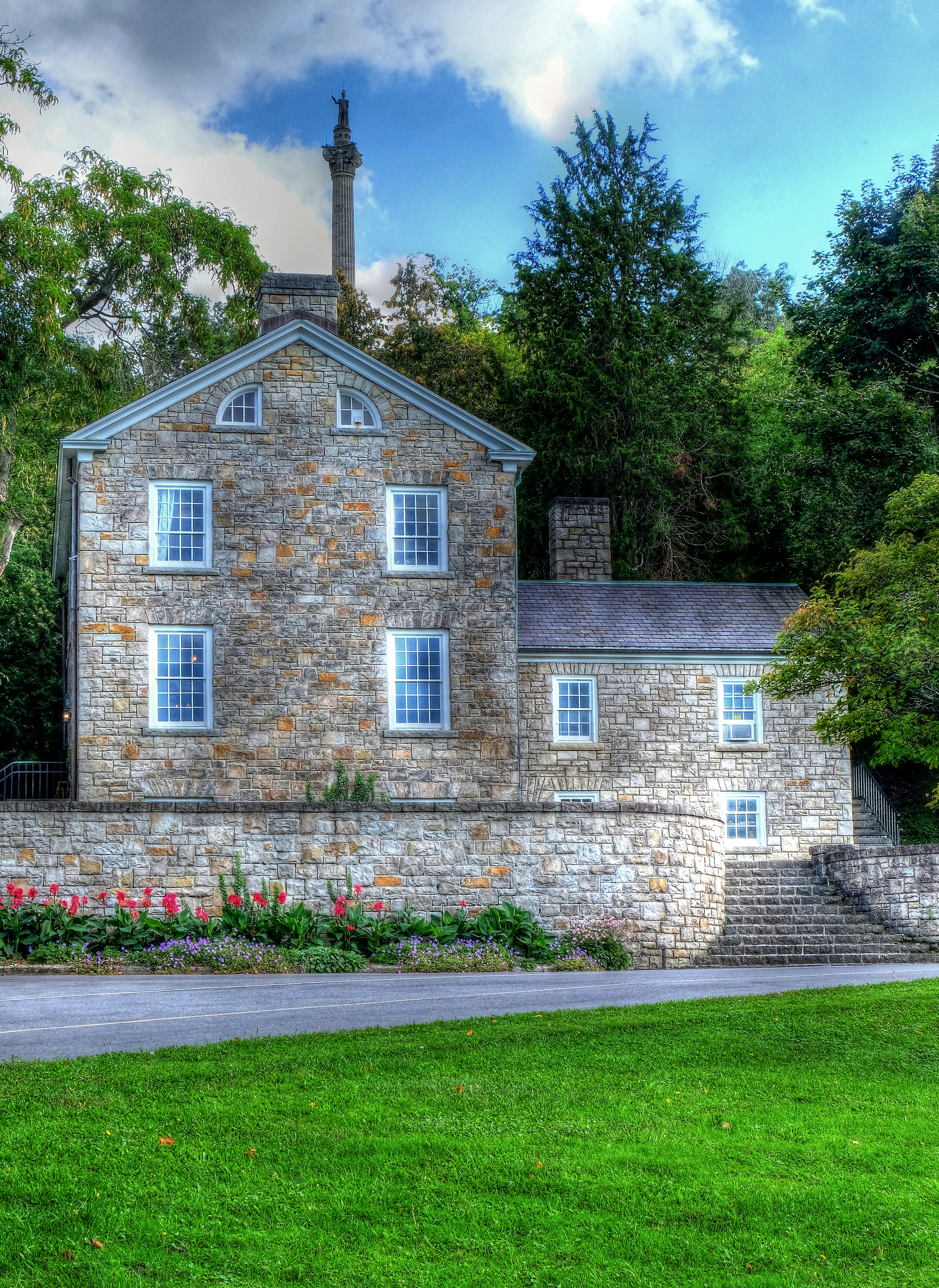
Mckenzie Printery, c. 1824

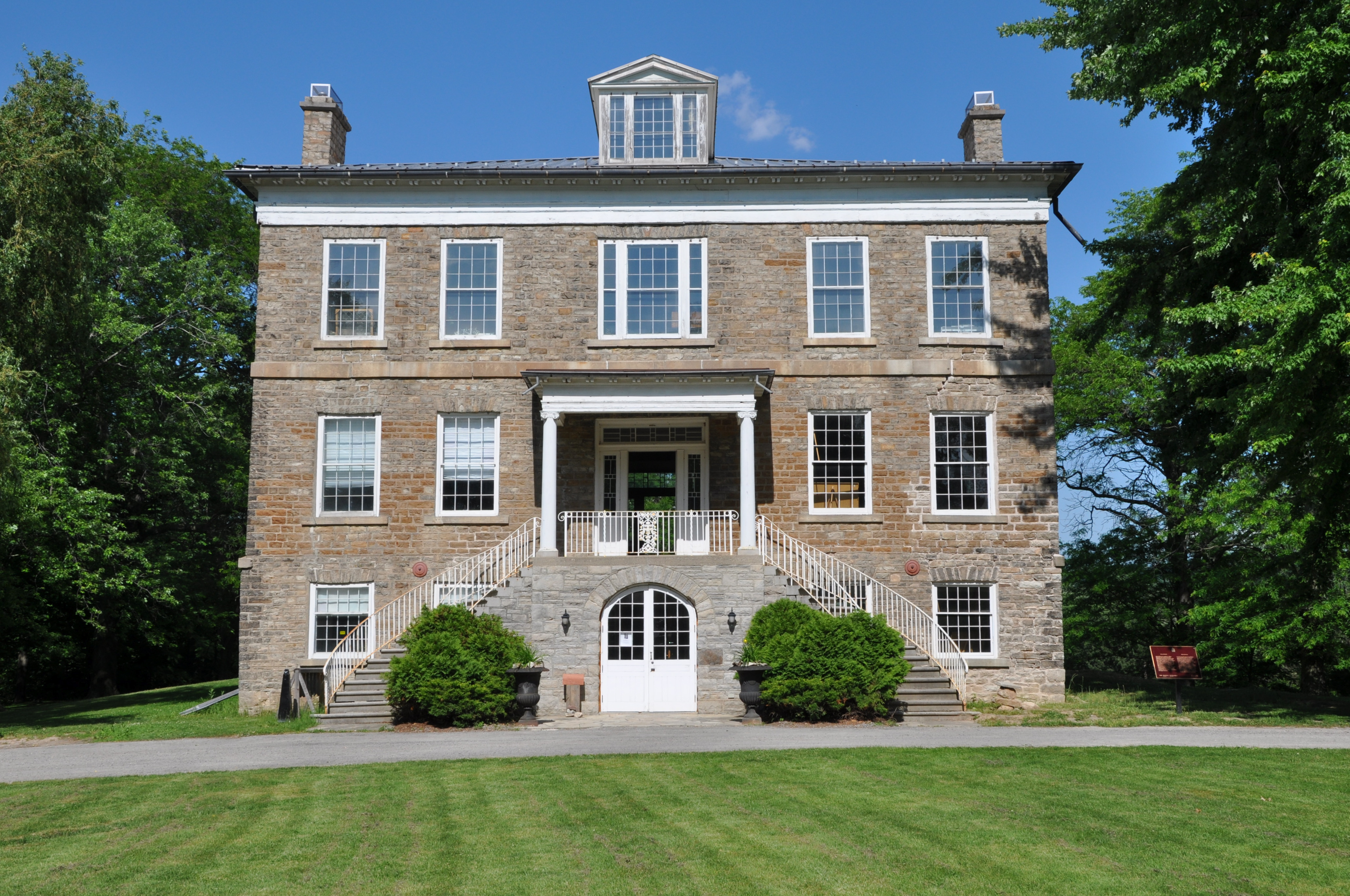
Willowbank, finished in 1836

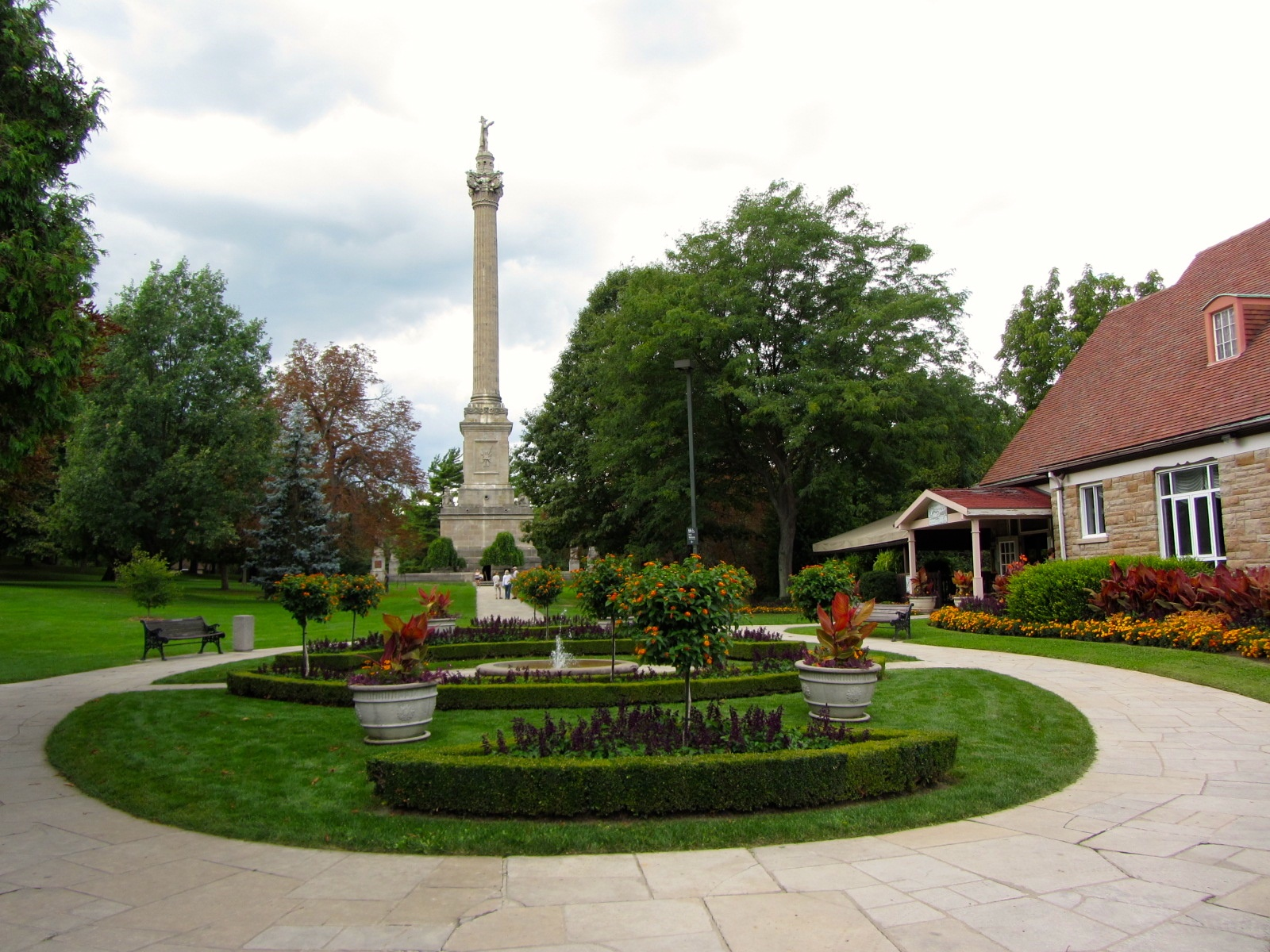
Queenston Heights Park (10156897585)
