= Willowbank =

Willowbank may refer to:

- School of Restoration Arts at Willowbank, a school and centre for conservation studies, Canada
- Willowbank Estate, a mansion in Ontario, Canada
- Willowbank Wildlife Reserve, a wildlife park in Christchurch, New Zealand
- Willowbank, Queensland, a suburb of Ipswich in the state of Queensland, Australia
- Willowbank Raceway, at Willowbank, Queensland
- Willowbank (album), a 2017 album by Yumi Zouma
- Willowbank F.C., a football club in Northern Ireland, United Kingdom
