= Carnochan =

Carnochan is a surname. Notable people with the surname include:

- Janet Carnochan (1839–1926), Canadian historian
- John Carnochan (born 1960), American film editor
- John Murray Carnochan (1817–1887), American surgeon
