= Niagara Public School =

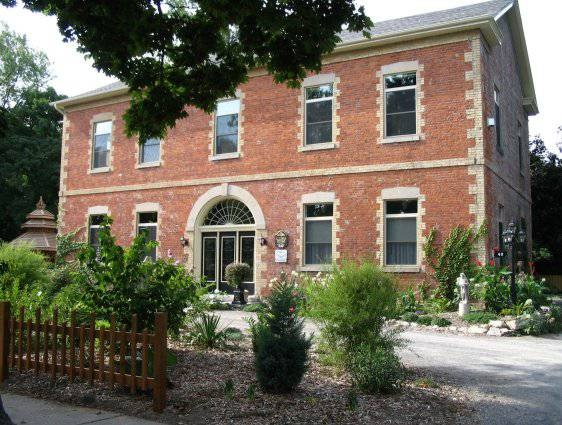
Niagara Public School

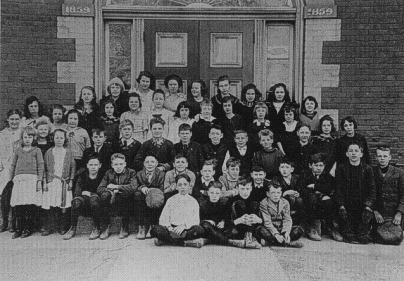
A graduating class from Niagara Public School

Niagara Public School, today known as School House Bed and Breakfast, was a public school in Niagara-on-the-Lake, Ontario (then called Newark in the Province of Canada). The school house is located at 40 Platoff Street in the National Historic District known as Niagara-on-the-Lake or Old Town.

== History ==
The large two-storey brick building was built in 1859 as a public school, serving the town's children until 1948 when the new Parliament Oak School was built nearby. The construction of the school was a result of The Great Swap, the first and largest surrender of a portion of the military reserve around Fort Mississauga since its boundaries were created in 1796. The portion of land was sold to the Honourable James Crooks, who in 1854 sold a partial lot to the Town Council of Niagara for "uses of Common Schools and Grammar Schools in the Town of Niagara forever." It has also been described as being on the military grounds, and historic photos show cadets or other soldiers lined up outside. One of its early principals was Janet Carnochan in 1872. The school house served elementary grades and had four classrooms, two on each floor. In 1882, the school began serving both Roman Catholic and Protestant students. The school was used until 1948, after which it was converted into a four unit apartment building. In 2002 a long renovation began, and in 2005 it was converted into a bed and breakfast named the Allison House Inn, renamed BranCliff Inn in 2012, and School House Bed and Breakfast in 2020.

The National Historic Site designation of the historic district, in 2003, includes buildings built from 1815 to 1859 in a 25 block area having "location close to the Niagara River on Front Street and extending approximately four blocks north to Castlereagh Street". The school is on the southeast corner of a block that is wholly included in the district; adjacent blocks across Platoff and Davy Streets from the school are not included in the district.
