= Shaw Festival =

Theatre festival in Niagara-on-the-Lake, Ontario, Canada

- Festival logo
- Location: Niagara-on-the-Lake, Ontario, Canada
- Founded: 1962
- Founded by: Brian Doherty and Calvin Rand
- Directors: Tim Carroll, Tim Jennings
- Type of play: Plays by or in the spirit of George Bernard Shaw
- Festival date: April–December each year
- Website: www.shawfest.com

The Shaw Festival is a charitable theatre festival in Niagara-on-the-Lake, Ontario, Canada. It is the second largest repertory theatre company in North America, second only to the Stratford Festival. The Shaw Festival was founded in 1962. Originally, it only featured productions written by George Bernard Shaw, but changes were later implemented by Christopher Newton and Jackie Maxwell that widened the theatre's scope. As of 2019, the theatre company was considered to be one of the largest 20 employers in the Niagara Region.

== History ==
The Festival's roots can be traced to 1962 when Brian Doherty and Calvin Rand staged a summertime "Salute to Shaw" at the Court House Theatre. For eight weekends, Doherty and his crew produced Shaw's Don Juan in Hell and Candida. In 1964, the Shaw Festival became fully professional, its first fully Equity year with a production of Shaw's Heartbreak House.

Paxton Whitehead took over management of the company in 1967. During his tenure, he established the Festival Theatre. Queen Elizabeth II, Indira Gandhi, and Pierre Trudeau were among those who attended performances at the Shaw Festival Theatre during its inaugural season in 1973. Tony Van Bridge was the interim artistic director for the 1974–75 season. Christopher Newton had declined previous offers to serve as artistic director for the Shaw Festival before accepting the position in 1979. In a 2011 interview with The Globe and Mail, Newton stated that he "hadn't really liked Bernard Shaw very much" and that he "made no secret of that fact". Under Newton, the theatre produced plays that were written during the lifetime of Shaw (1856–1950). His decision to move the Shaw Festival away from the direction of museum theatre was controversial, which resulted in some members of the board directors to propose firing him, but they were not successful. The theatre stopped running at a financial deficit during Newton's tenure. His successor, Jackie Maxwell, was appointed in 2003 and expanded the theatre's scope further to include works that were set in the same time period as Shaw. By doing so, she was able to allow "strategic integration of female, Canadian and nonwhite voices into the festival's programming and casting". In 2003, a production of Michel Marc Bouchard's The Coronation Voyage (1995) was the first time a show that was written by a living playwright was featured at the Shaw Festival.

In the summer of 2015, it was announced that Tim Carroll would take over as artistic director and Tim Jennings as executive director. They announced Carroll's inaugural 2017 season in August 2016. In 2020, most of the productions scheduled for that season were cancelled due to the COVID-19 pandemic in Ontario. The theatre company reduced financial losses through production cancellations, donations, government subsidies, and insurance.

== Artistic directors ==
- Andrew Allan (1963–1965)
- Barry Morse (1966)
- Paxton Whitehead (1967–1977)
- Tony Van Bridge (1974 – 1975)
- Leslie Yeo (1979)
- Christopher Newton (1980–2002)
- Jackie Maxwell (2003–2016)
- Tim Carroll (2017–)

== Theatres ==
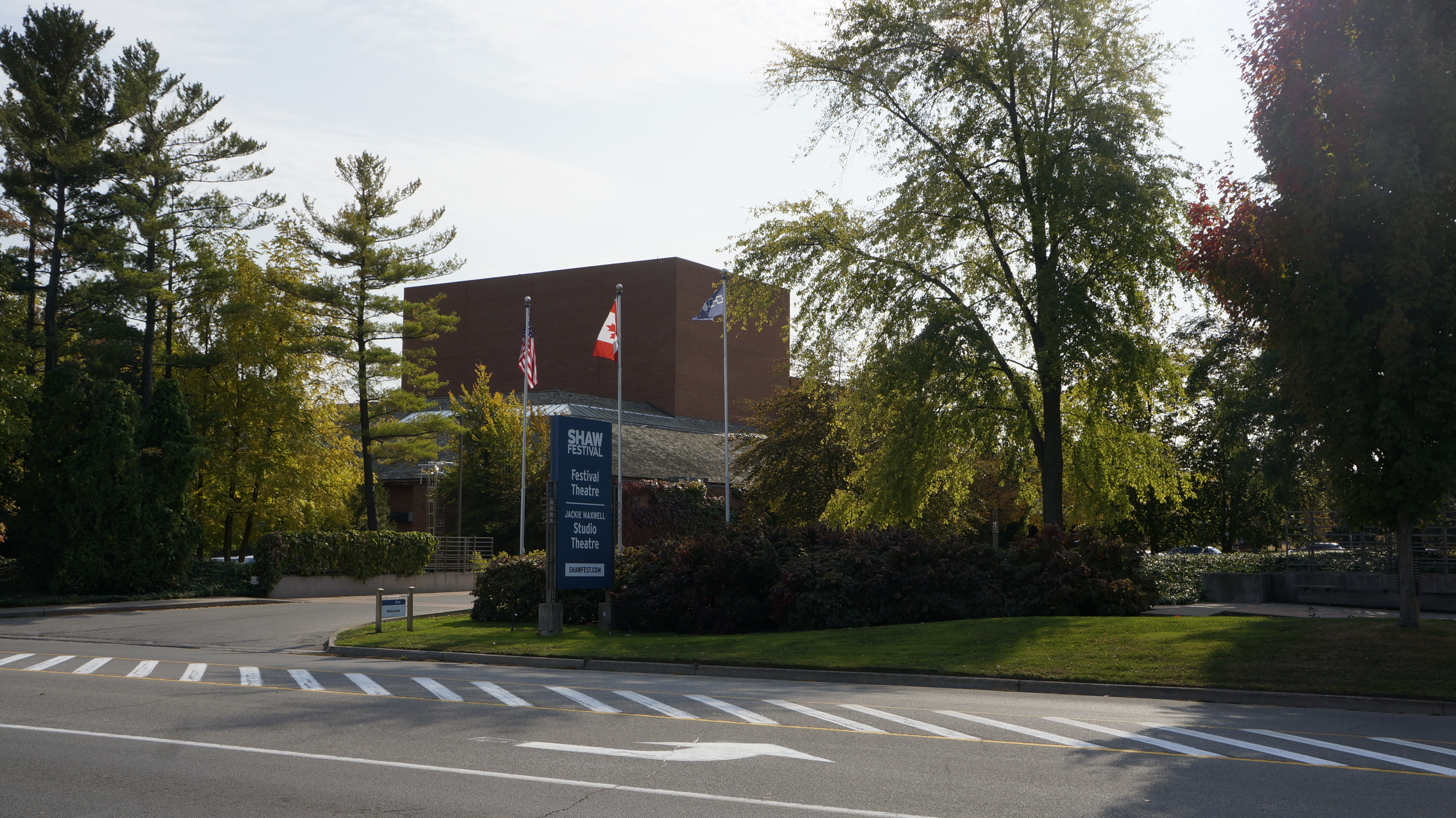
Festival Theatre

On 12 June 1973, the Shaw Festival opened its first permanent theatre, the Festival Theatre, on Queen's Parade.

Dates listed are when the theatre's association with the Shaw Festival began; The Court House and Royal George theatres predate the festival.

- Festival Theatre (1973, 856 seats)
- Royal George Theatre (1980, 305 seats)
- Jackie Maxwell Studio Theatre (2004, 267 seats)
- Shaw Spiegeltent (2023-2025 – on loan from Belgium)

Court House Theatre (1962–2017, 327 seats. 2026 -250 seats)

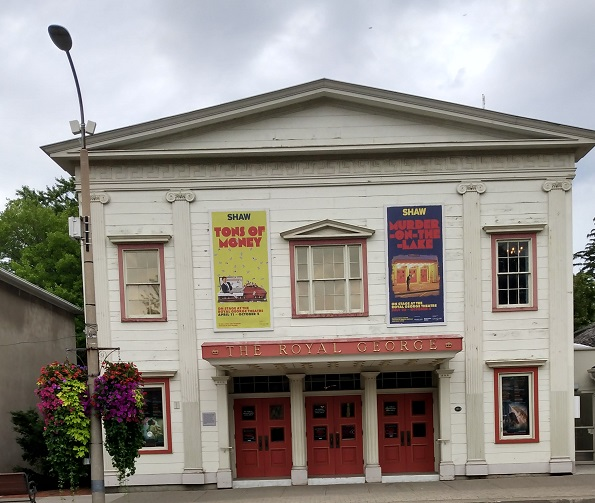
Royal George Theatre

The Royal George Theatre is slated to close at the end of the 2025 festival season. The building is too costly to maintain and there is not enough space to update the property to meet current accessibility accommodations. In April of 2025, the festival secured CA$35 million in Ontario government funding to rebuild the theatre with an estimated CA$75−85 million total budget. The new facility is expected to be completed in time for the start of the 2029 season in Spring of 2029. It will have 20% larger capacity with upgraded accessibility features to meet current standards.

== See also ==
- Shaw Festival production history
- Stratford Festival
- Theatre of Canada
