= Niagara-on-the-Lake =

Town in Ontario, Canada

- Town (lower-tier)
- Town of Niagara-on-the-Lake
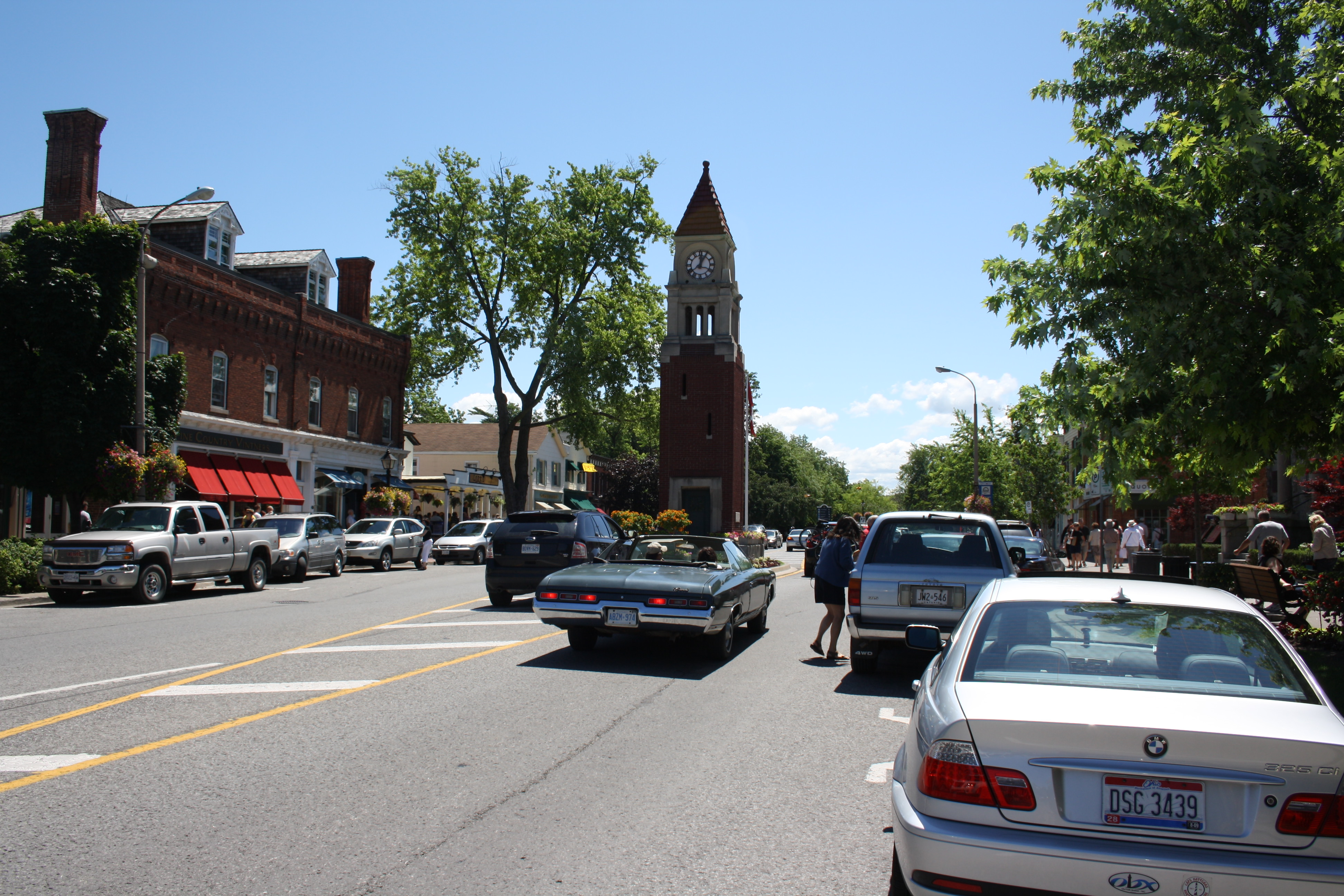

- Flag

- Location in southern Ontario Niagara-on-the-Lake (Southern Ontario)
- Coordinates: 43°15′19″N 79°4′18″W
- Country: Canada
- Province: Ontario
- Region: Niagara
- Settled: 1781
- Incorporated: 1792

Government
  - Lord Mayor: Gary Zalepa
  - Governing body: Town Council
  - MP: Tony Baldinelli
  - MPP: Wayne Gates

Area
  - Land: 132.81 km^{2} (51.28 sq mi)
- Elevation: 82.3 m (270 ft)

Population (2021)
  - Total: 19,088
  - Density: 131.8/km^{2} (341/sq mi)
- Demonyms: Niagaran; NOTLer
- Time zone: UTC-5 (Eastern (EST))
  - Summer (DST): UTC-4 (Eastern Daylight (EDT))
- Postal code: L0S 1J0
- Area codes: 905 and 289
- Website: www.notl.com

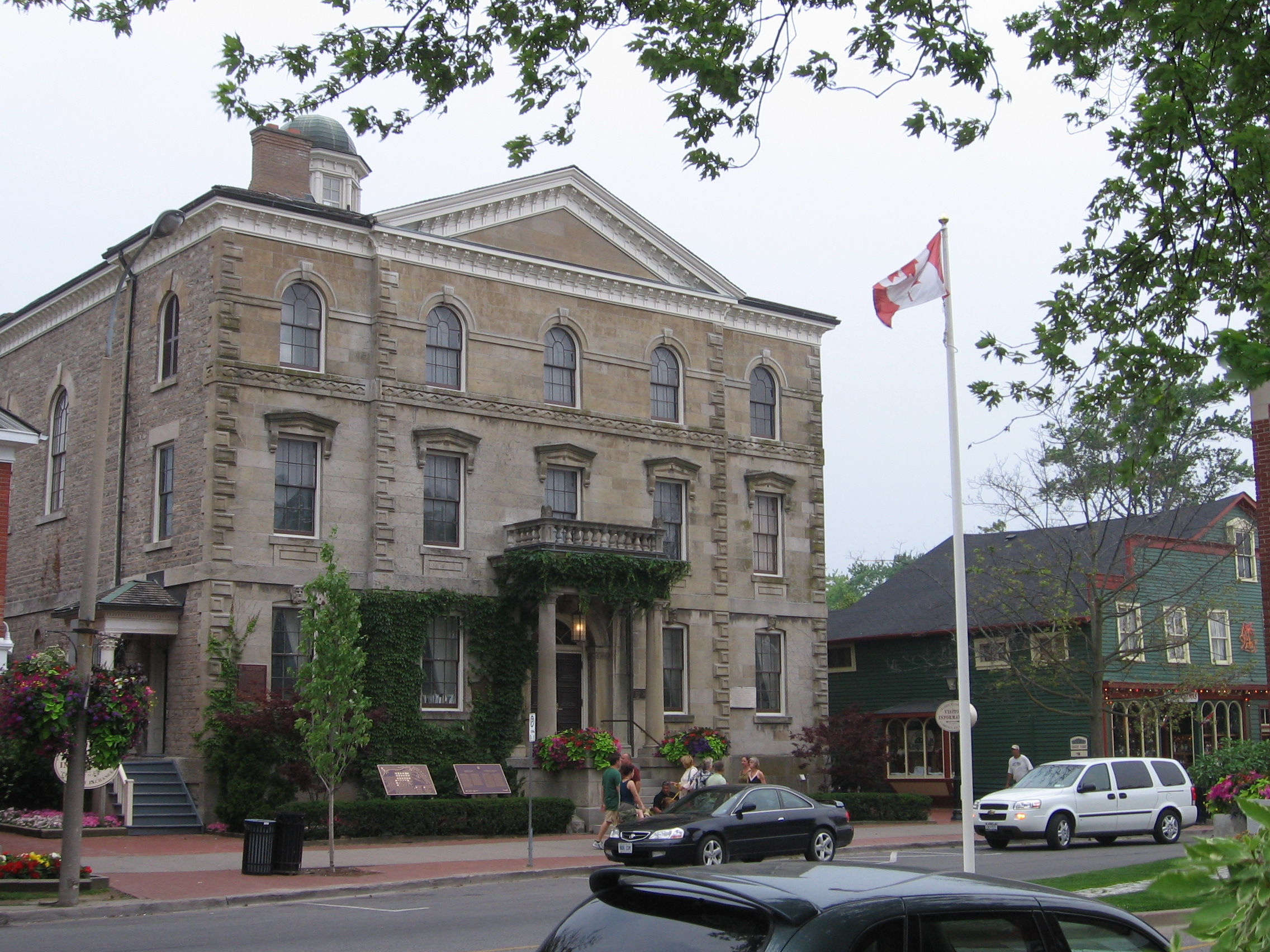
The Court House, a Shaw Festival theatre and Parks Canada headquarters of Niagara National Historic Sites, built in 1847.

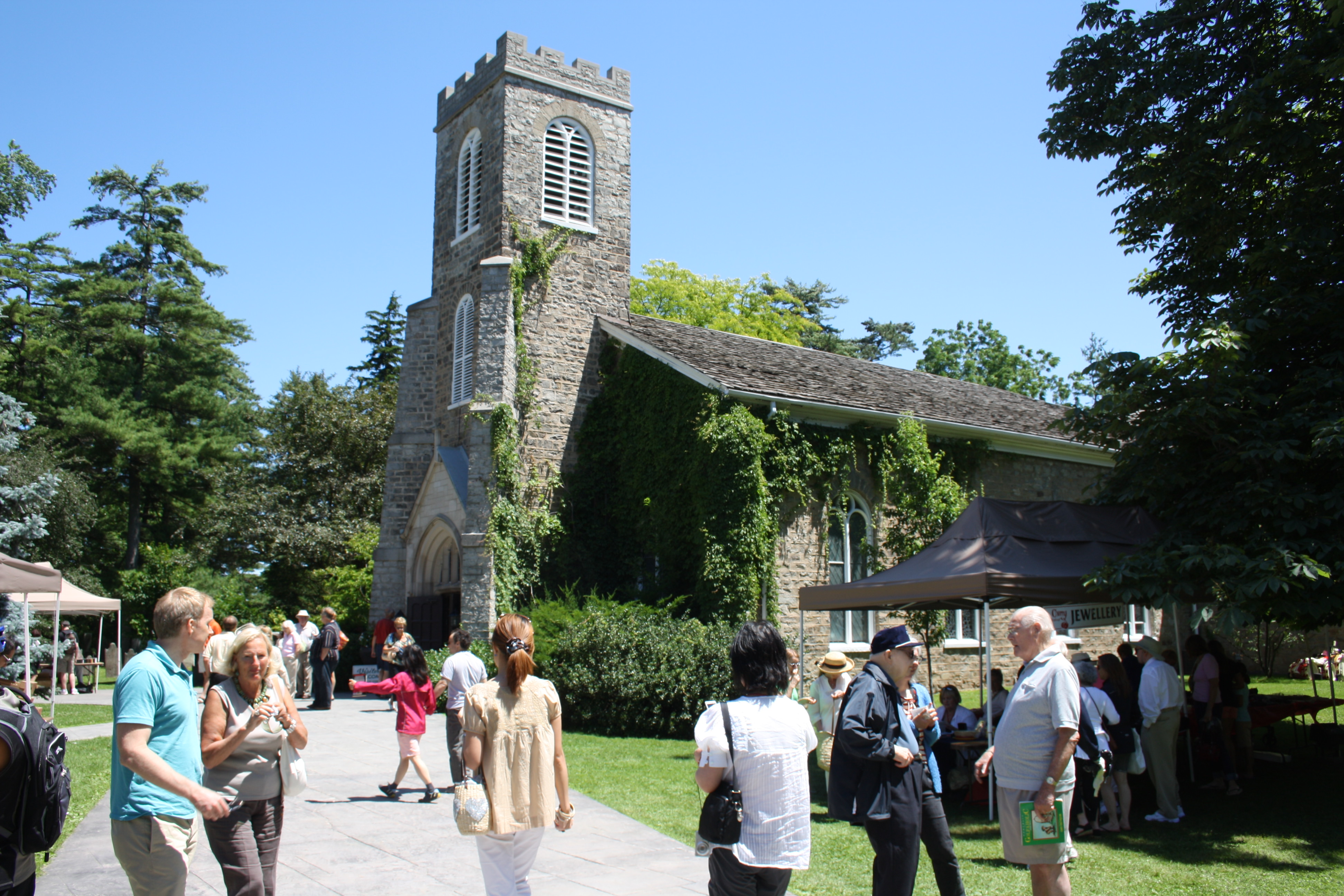
St. Mark's Church, built in 1809, founded in 1791

Niagara-on-the-Lake (NOTL) is a town in Ontario, Canada. It is located on the Niagara Peninsula at the point where the Niagara River meets Lake Ontario, across the river from New York, United States. Niagara-on-the-Lake is in the Niagara Region of Ontario and is the only town in Canada that has a lord mayor. It had a population of 19,088 as of the 2021 Canadian census.

Niagara-on-the-Lake is important in the history of Canada: it served as the first capital of the province of Upper Canada, the predecessor of Ontario. It was called Newark from 1792 to 1797. During the War of 1812, the town, the two former villages of St. David's and Queenston, and Fort George were the sites of numerous battles following the American invasion of Upper Canada, and the town was razed. Niagara-on-the-Lake is home to the oldest Catholic church, the second-oldest Anglican church in Ontario, and the oldest surviving golf course in North America.

Today, Niagara-on-the-Lake draws tourists with its colonial-style buildings, the Shaw Festival, Fort George, wineries, an outlet mall on the highway, and its proximity to Niagara Falls. The Niagara Region has the second-highest percentage of seniors in Ontario.

== History ==
Before the British settlers came, the point where Fort Mississauga is situated was inhabited by at least three Native American tribes: the Neutral (15th century); Seneca (late 17th century); and Mississauga (18th century).

The settlement was founded in 1781 as Butlersburg in honour of Colonel John Butler, the commander of Butler's Rangers. It was later renamed West Niagara to distinguish it from Fort Niagara. It was a British military base and haven for pro-British loyalists fleeing the United States during the volatile aftermath of the American Revolution. Renamed Newark by Lieutenant-Governor John Graves Simcoe in 1792, it was the first capital of Upper Canada (now the province of Ontario). The Upper Canada legislature first met at Navy Hall on September 17, 1792, and met there four more times until June 1796. In 1797, Simcoe moved the capital to York because Newark was very close to the border with the U.S. Newark was renamed Niagara in 1798.

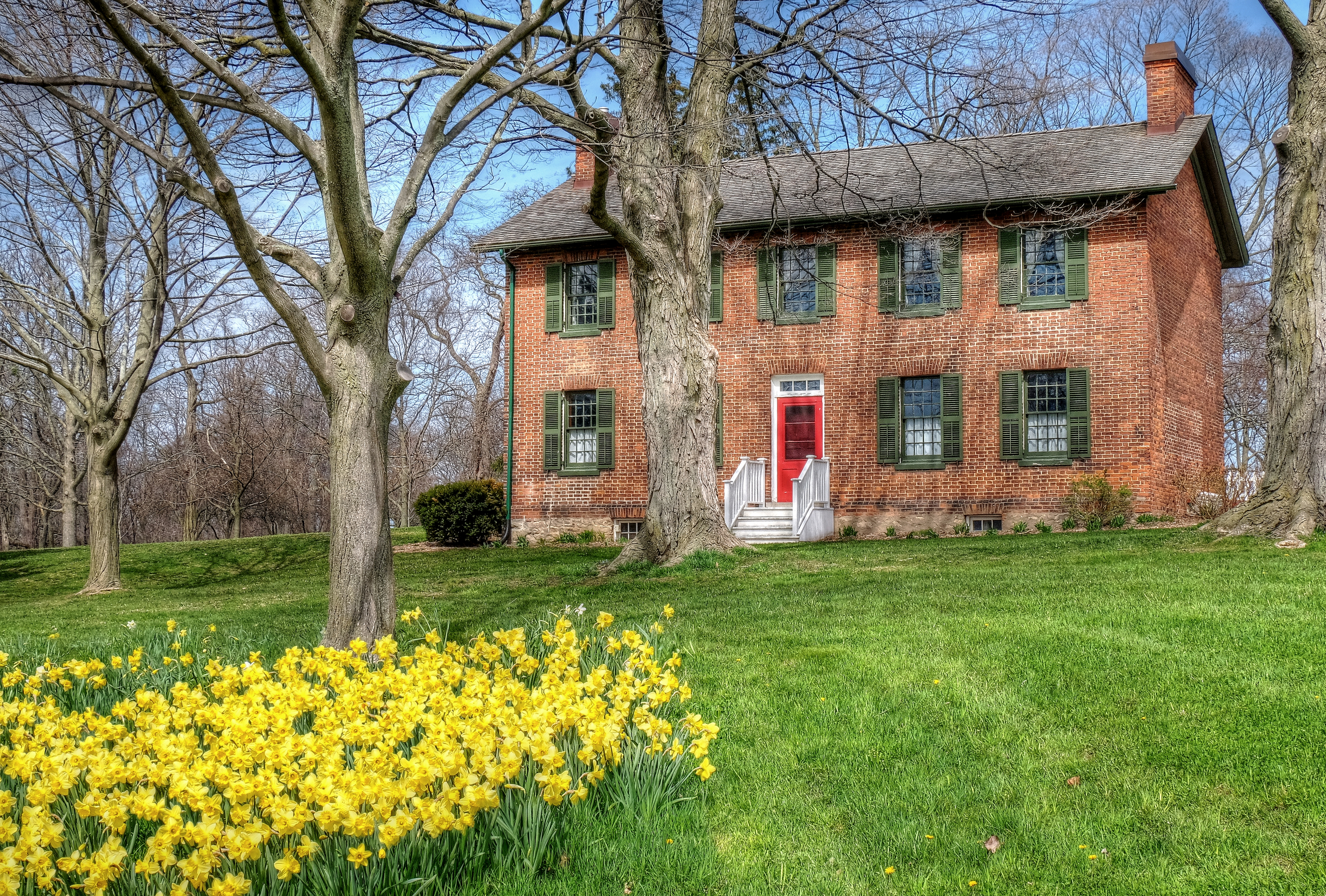
McFarland House, c. 1800

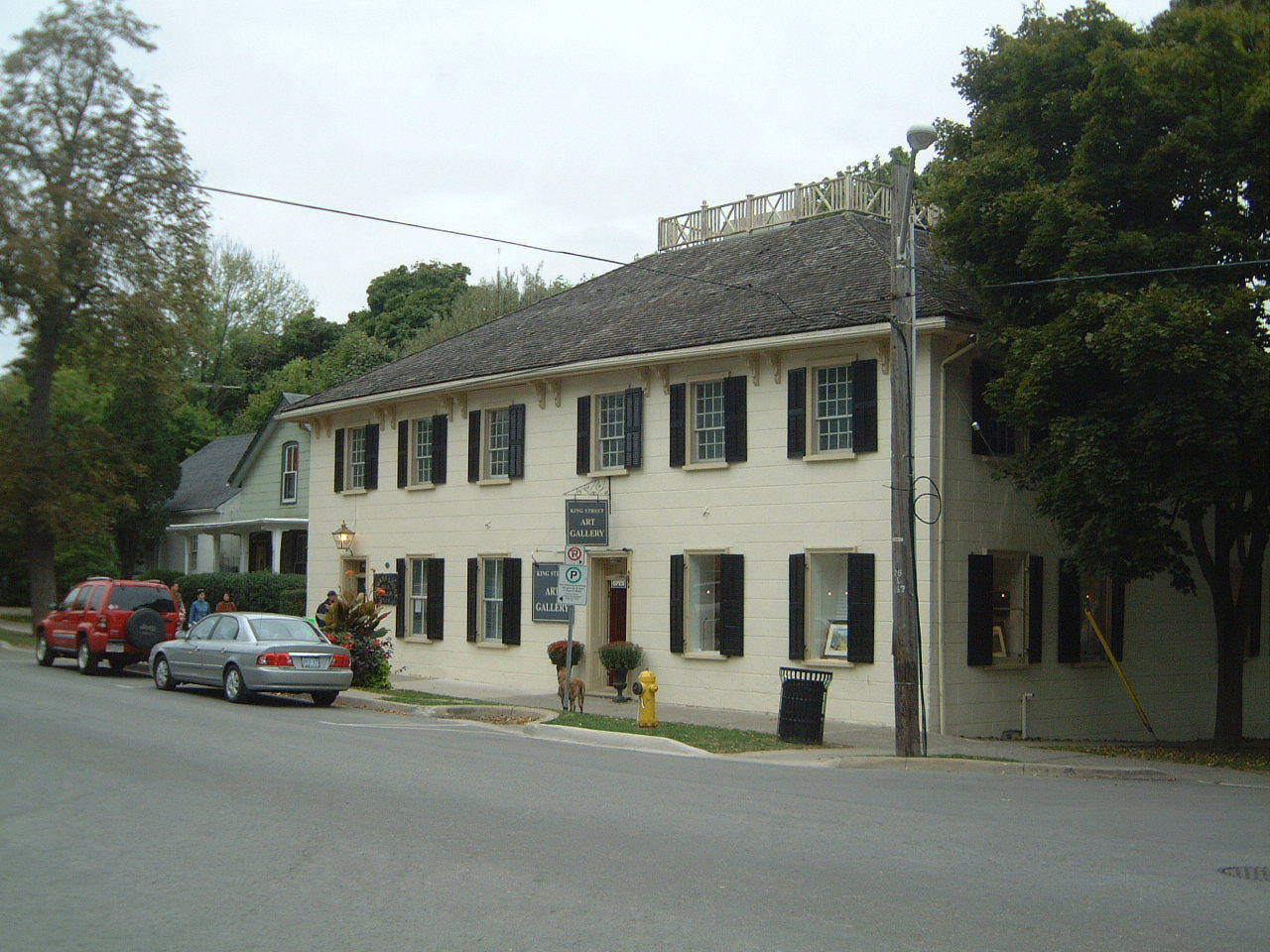
Niagara lodge 2, built in 1816

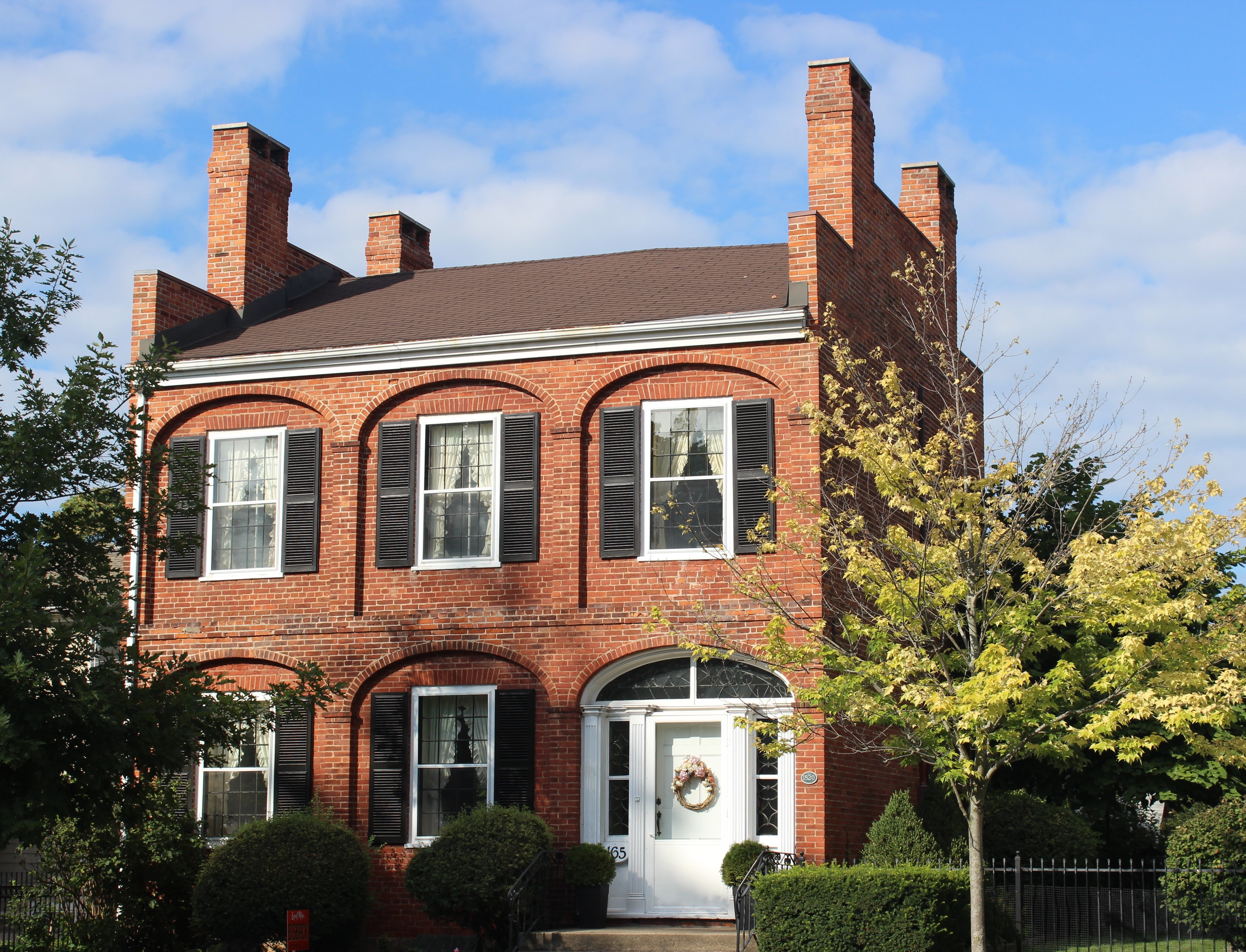
McDougal-Harrison, built in 1820

Fort George was built just south of the settlement in 1796–1799. During the War of 1812, Niagara was taken in the Battle of Fort George by American forces in May 1813 after a two-day bombardment by cannon from Fort Niagara and the American fleet, followed by a fierce battle. After capturing Fort George, the Americans built their own fortifications there. The British retook the fort in December 1813 but abandoned it in 1815. The tiny portion of the fort that still remains has been fully restored. Fort Mississauga was built starting in 1813 but was not completed until after the war in 1816. During the war, the settlement of Niagara was razed and burnt to the ground by American soldiers as they withdrew to Fort Niagara. (Afterwards, on December 19, 1813, the British captured Fort Niagara.) The citizens rebuilt Niagara after the war, with the residential quarter around Queen Street and toward King Street, where the new court house was rebuilt out of range of Fort Niagara's cannons.

The Smith's Canadian Gazetteer of 1846 describes "Niagara (formerly called Newark)" as follows:

It has been a place of considerable trade. On the east side of the town is a large military reserve. About half a mile up the river are the ruins of Fort George, where the remains of General Brock were originally interred; they were removed. A new town-hall and court-house are intended to be erected by the town. There is a fire brigade with two engines and a hook and ladder company. Churches and chapels total five. Two newspapers are published weekly ... Steamboats run daily, as long as the weather will allow of it, from Toronto ... The Niagara Harbour and Dock Company were incorporated in the year 1830 ... the vessels turned out by the Company [include] the steamboat "London," which commenced running in the spring of 1845, the fastest boat on the upper lakes ... The Company usually employ about 150 hands; and, when particularly busy, have employed as many as 350. There is also on the premises a marine railway, large enough for hauling up vessels of the first class. Post Office, post every day. Professions and Trades.—Three physicians and surgeons, nine lawyers, twelve stores, taverns, two chemists and druggists, three booksellers and stationers, two saddlers, four wagon makers, two watchmakers, two tallow-chandlers, marble works, two printers, two cabinet makers, one hatter, four bakers, two livery stables, two tinsmiths, three blacksmiths, six tailors, seven shoemakers, one tobacconist, one bank agency, ... large quantities of apples, peaches, and cider are shipped annually.

In 1859, the town built its first public school, Niagara Public School. The town's present name of Niagara-on-the-Lake was adopted around 1880 as a postal address to distinguish the town from Niagara Falls. The name was officially adopted in 1970 when the Town of Niagara and the Township of Niagara merged.

=== Historic sites ===
Most of the former military sites, such as Fort George, Navy Hall, and Butler's Barracks, have been restored. Fort George's restoration was done as a "Make Work Project," guided by plans from the Royal Engineers during the Great Depression of the 1930s, an early example of historic preservation. Fort George National Historic Site is a focal point in a collection of War of 1812 sites, which, collectively, are managed by Parks Canada under the name Niagara National Historic Sites. That administrative name includes several national historic sites: Fort Mississauga, Mississauga Point Lighthouse (1804, the first on the Great Lakes), Navy Hall, Butler's Barracks, and Queenston Heights.

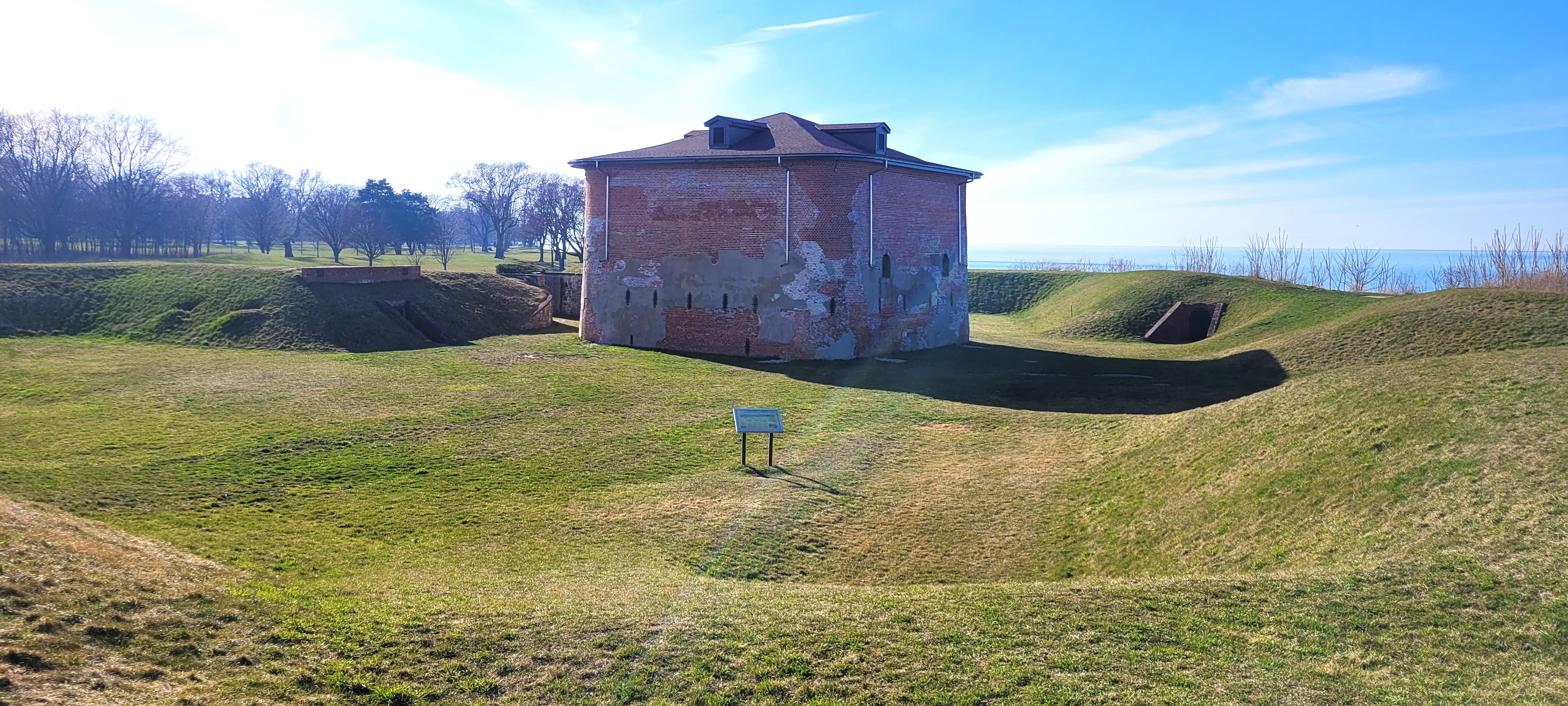
Fort Mississauga

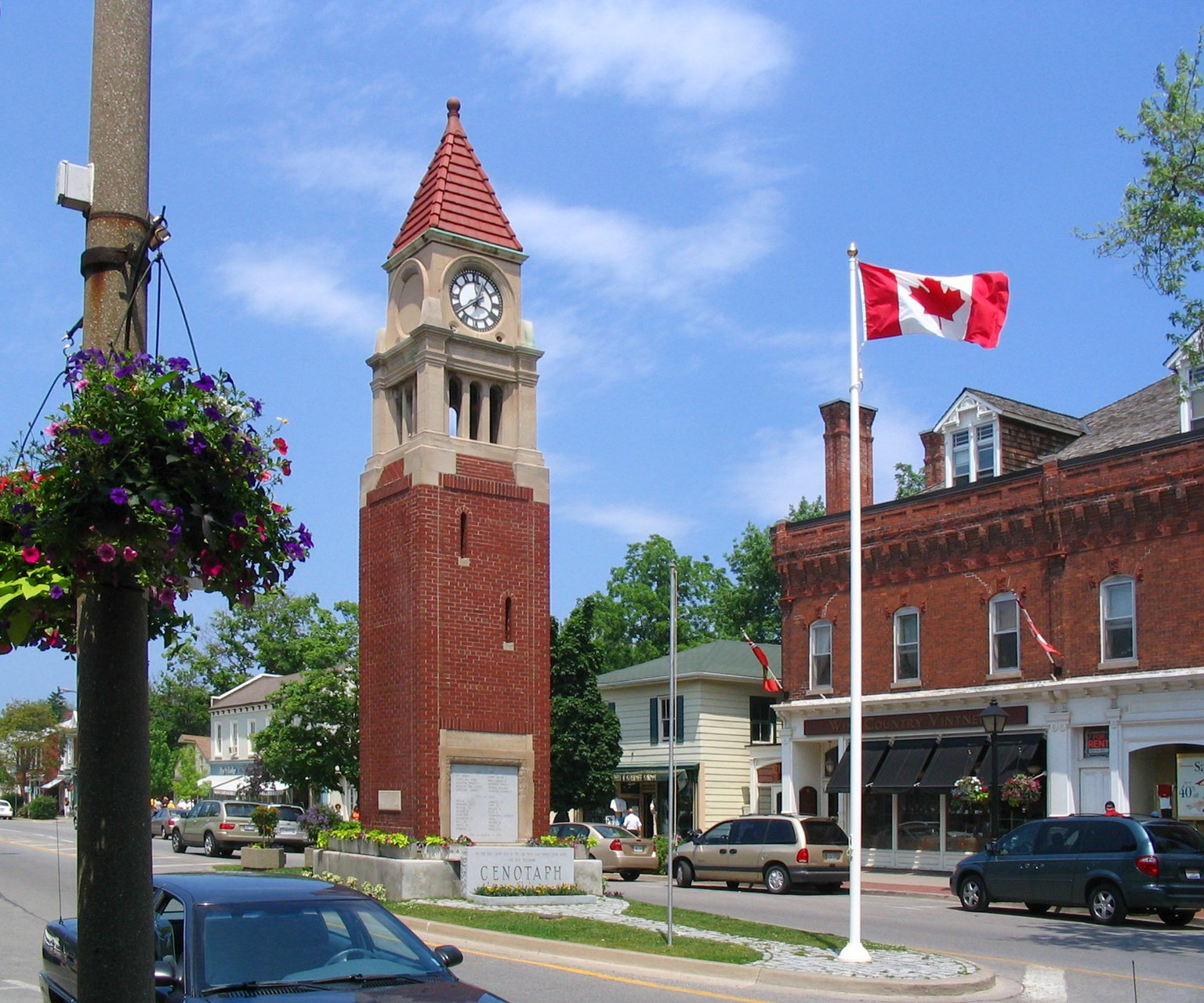
Cenotaph and clock tower

Niagara-on-the-Lake features historical plaques. Critical battles in defence of Upper Canada took place here, and at nearby at Queenston and St. David's, both now part of Niagara-on-the-Lake. In one of these, Laura Secord gained her fame (She is known for having walked 32 km out of American-occupied territory in 1813 to warn British forces of an impending American attack). The town was both as a stop on the Underground Railroad for those travelling further into Upper Canada and as a refuge in its own right.

Its stock of regency and classical revival buildings, considered the best in the country from the post-War of 1812 period, led the Historic Sites and Monuments Board of Canada to recommend the town's historic district be designated a National Historic Site of Canada, a designation which was approved in 2003. The historic centre had been designated as a provincial Heritage Conservation District under the Ontario Heritage Act in 1986. Although it did not make the final list, the historic district was considered for nomination as a World Heritage Site. The town has other National Historic Sites of Canada within its boundaries: the Battlefield of Fort George and nearby Fort George, Butler's Barracks, Fort Drummond, Fort Mississauga, the site of the Mississauga Point Lighthouse, the Niagara Apothecary (the oldest apothecary in Canada), the Niagara District Court House, Queenston Heights, Queenston-Chippawa Hydro-electric Plant, Willowbank and Vrooman's Battery.

The Gate House, built after 1849, was the site of the former Wilson's Hotel and the inaugural meeting of the Law Society of Upper Canada in 1797. John "Irish John Wilson (1744-~1798) was a sergeant with the Butler's Rangers and Loyalist from New Jersey. The stone foundation of the Gate House is the remains of the hotel after 1849 fire. His son John Wilson Jr. built the nearby Wilson-Guy House.

- Other historic sites include the Old Court House Theatre, built in 1847; Queen's Royal Park, the site of the former Queen's Royal Hotel; St. Mark's Church, the oldest Anglican Church in Ontario after the Mohawk Chapel; St. Vincent de Paul, the oldest Catholic Church in Ontario; the McFarland House, the oldest building in town; the Niagara Public School, built in 1859; and the Niagara Golf Club, the oldest golf course in North America still in use.

== Government ==
Niagara-on-the-Lake is within the federal electoral district of Niagara Falls—Niagara-on-the-Lake, currently represented in the House of Commons of Canada by Tony Baldinelli, and the provincial electoral district of provincial electoral district of Niagara Falls, represented in the Legislative Assembly of Ontario by Wayne Gates.

It is the only municipality in Canada whose elected leader is designated as lord mayor, a title most common in the United Kingdom. Popular legend suggests Prince Edward, Duke of Kent and Strathearn bestowed the title on the mayor of Niagara during a visit to the town in the early 19th century, in recognition of the town's history as the first capital of Upper Canada; however, there is no record of a mayor using it until Jerry Mussen in the early 1920s, and even afterward the title was used only irregularly until the Regional Municipality of Niagara Act of 1969 legislated that "The mayor of the Town of Niagara-on-the-Lake shall be known as the Lord Mayor." The town's current lord mayor is Gary Zalepa, as of the 2022 municipal election. Previous lord mayors have included Betty Disero, Patrick Darte, Dave Eke, Gary Burroughs, Art Viola, Mike Dietsch, Stan Ignatczyk, Jim Marino, Wilbert Dick, Jake Froese and Fred Goring.

== Climate ==
Niagara-on-the-Lake experiences a humid continental climate (Köppen Dfb bordering on Dfa) using the 0 °C (32 °F) isotherm but also borders an oceanic climate (Köppen Cfb) and a humid subtropical climate (Köppen Cfa) using the −3 °C (27 °F) isotherm, having four seasons, with warm summers, cold winters, and cool to mild autumns and springs. Snowfall is moderate, averaging around 3 feet (92 cm) per year, one of the lowest yearly snowfall totals received in all of Ontario. A long shoreline along Lake Ontario results in more moderate temperatures than neighbouring cities, as well as seasonal lag.

Climate data for Niagara-on-the-Lake (1981–2010)
Month	Jan	Feb	Mar	Apr	May	Jun	Jul	Aug	Sep	Oct	Nov	Dec	Year
Record high °C (°F)	19.0 (66.2)	17.0 (62.6)	24.5 (76.1)	29.0 (84.2)	34.0 (93.2)	36.0 (96.8)	36.5 (97.7)	35.0 (95.0)	34.0 (93.2)	29.0 (84.2)	23.5 (74.3)	17.5 (63.5)	36.5 (97.7)
Mean daily maximum °C (°F)	0.2 (32.4)	0.2 (32.4)	4.4 (39.9)	10.9 (51.6)	17.6 (63.7)	23.4 (74.1)	26.3 (79.3)	25.3 (77.5)	21.0 (69.8)	14.8 (58.6)	8.4 (47.1)	2.2 (36.0)	12.9 (55.2)
Daily mean °C (°F)	−3 (27)	−3.2 (26.2)	0.7 (33.3)	6.7 (44.1)	12.6 (54.7)	18.4 (65.1)	21.7 (71.1)	20.9 (69.6)	16.6 (61.9)	10.7 (51.3)	5.0 (41.0)	−0.8 (30.6)	8.9 (48.0)
Mean daily minimum °C (°F)	−6.3 (20.7)	−6.6 (20.1)	−3.0 (26.6)	2.4 (36.3)	7.5 (45.5)	13.4 (56.1)	17.0 (62.6)	16.4 (61.5)	12.2 (54.0)	6.5 (43.7)	1.5 (34.7)	−3.8 (25.2)	4.8 (40.6)
Record low °C (°F)	−26.0 (−14.8)	−20.0 (−4.0)	−16.0 (3.2)	−9.5 (14.9)	−1.5 (29.3)	4.0 (39.2)	8.5 (47.3)	5.0 (41.0)	1.0 (33.8)	−5.0 (23.0)	−10.0 (14.0)	−19.5 (−3.1)	−26.0 (−14.8)
Average precipitation mm (inches)	55.1 (2.17)	51.0 (2.01)	57.7 (2.27)	81.1 (3.19)	81.9 (3.22)	75.8 (2.98)	79.2 (3.12)	74.9 (2.95)	91.8 (3.61)	76.8 (3.02)	88.1 (3.47)	66.5 (2.62)	879.6 (34.63)
Average rainfall mm (inches)	30.1 (1.19)	23.8 (0.94)	43.5 (1.71)	76.6 (3.02)	81.9 (3.22)	75.8 (2.98)	79.2 (3.12)	74.9 (2.95)	91.8 (3.61)	76.8 (3.02)	84.1 (3.31)	49.0 (1.93)	787.4 (31.00)
Average snowfall cm (inches)	24.9 (9.8)	27.2 (10.7)	14.1 (5.6)	4.5 (1.8)	0.0 (0.0)	0.0 (0.0)	0.0 (0.0)	0.0 (0.0)	0.0 (0.0)	0.0 (0.0)	4.0 (1.6)	17.5 (6.9)	92.2 (36.3)
Average precipitation days (≥ 0.2 mm)	14.6	10.8	12.6	14.2	12.6	11.3	11.0	11.5	12.5	13.8	15.7	13.5	154.3
Average rainy days (≥ 0.2 mm)	6.9	5.0	9.5	13.1	12.6	11.3	11.0	11.5	12.5	13.8	14.4	8.5	130.3
Average snowy days (≥ 0.2 cm)	8.8	6.9	4.3	1.6	0.0	0.0	0.0	0.0	0.0	0.0	1.5	6.1	29.1
Source: Environment Canada

== Demographics ==
Census	Population
1871	1,600
1901	1,258
1911	1,318
1921	1,357
1931	1,228
1941	1,541
1951	2,712
1961	2,108
1971	12,552
1981	12,186
1991	12,945
2001	13,839
2006	14,587
2011	15,400
2016	17,511
2021	19,088

In the 2021 Census of Population conducted by Statistics Canada, Niagara-on-the-Lake had a population of 19,088 living in 7,857 of its 8,578 total private dwellings, a change of 9% from its 2016 population of 17,511. With a land area of 131.35 km^{2} (50.71 sq mi), it had a population density of 145.3/km^{2} (376.4/sq mi) in 2021.

== Communities ==
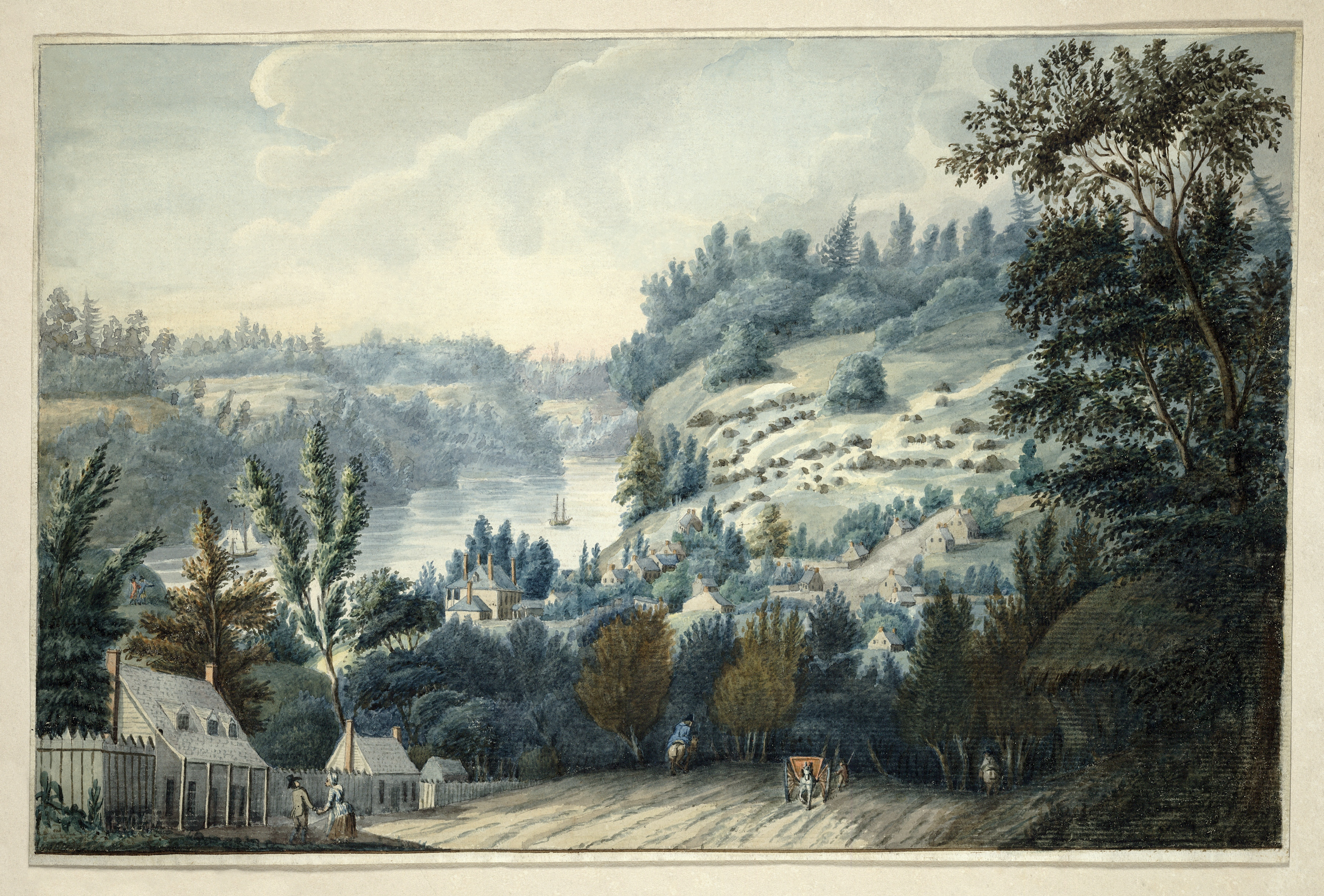
Queenston, c. 1805, by Army surgeon Edward Walsh

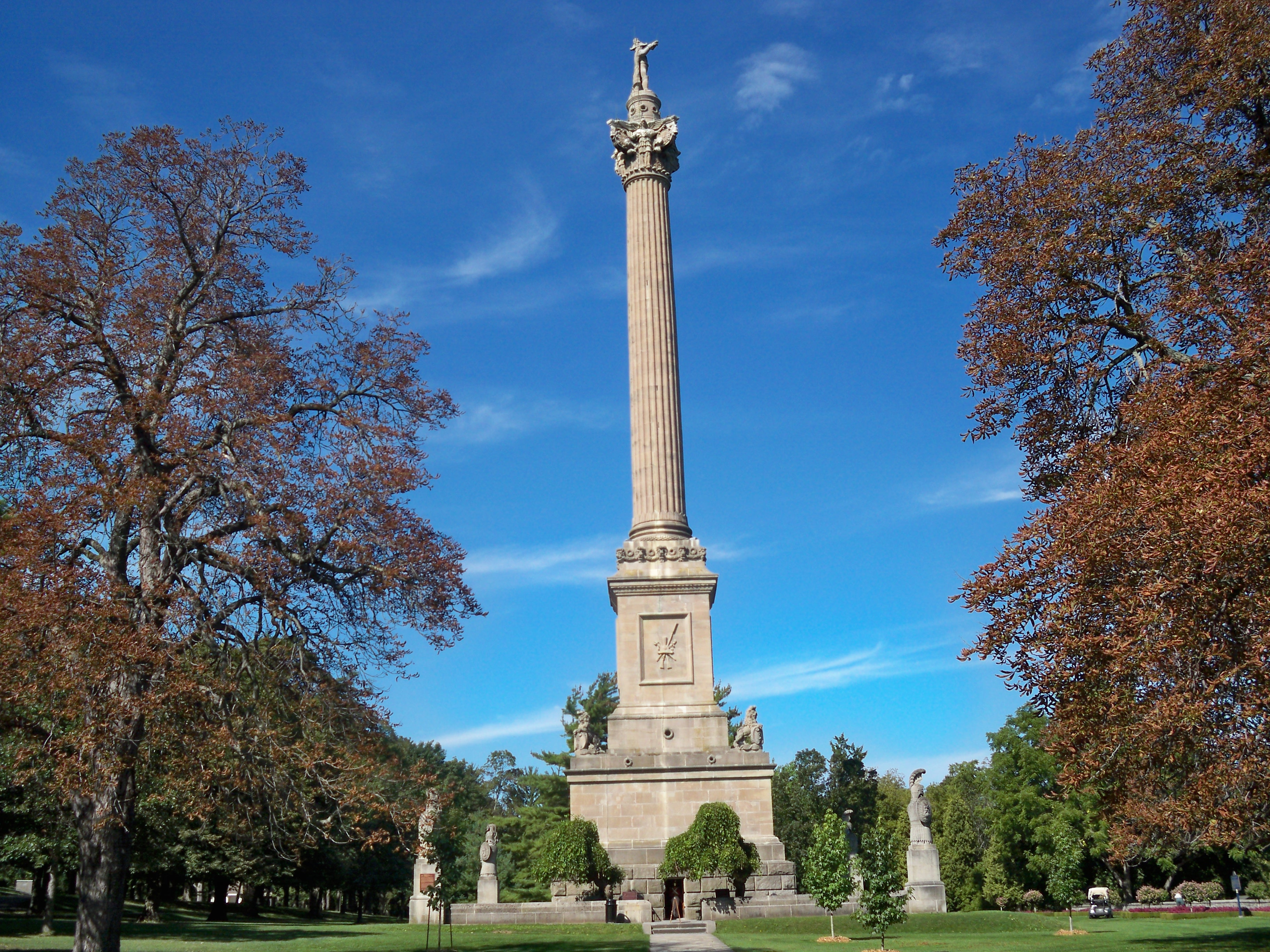
Brock's Monument at Queenston Heights, Ontario

In addition to the primary town site of Niagara-on-the-Lake (the Old Town), the town also includes the settlements of Colemans, Homer, McNab, Mississauga Beach, Queenston, St. Davids, and Virgil. In June 2024, the museum for the town received funding from Library and Archives Canada to document oral histories about the Mennonite community in Virgil.

Glendale is located near the junction of the Queen Elizabeth Way QEW, Highway 405, and Highway 55, and adjacent to the Welland Canal. It is home to the Niagara-on-the-Lake campus of Niagara College and a large outdoor shopping mall.

Virgil, just southwest of the Old Town of Niagara-on-the-Lake, is the area most visited by tourists. The community has a large Mennonite community, who settled in the area from Russia in the early to mid-20th century. Virgil has a large sports park, serving as the centre of Niagara-on-the-Lake's bustling hockey, softball, lacrosse and soccer leagues, two arenas, three baseball diamonds and a skate park. Once a year, on the Victoria Day weekend in May, the community holds its "Virgil Stampede." The festival includes rides, attractions and its annual soccer start-up tournament. Virgil's educational institutions are St. Michael's Elementary School and Crossroads Public School, which opened in September 2011, amalgamating the now-closed Virgil and Colonel John Butler Public Schools. The town's only secondary school, Niagara District, was closed by the District School Board of Niagara in 2010.

The Old Town also had an elementary school on King Street: Parliament Oak Public School. It was on the site of the signing of the Act Against Slavery of 1793, by the first legislative session of the parliament of Upper Canada. The school was closed on June 25, 2015.

- St. Davids Public School serves Junior Kindergarten to Grade 8 students in the southern part of the municipality.
- St. Michael Catholic Elementary School serves Junior Kindergarten to Grade 8 students in the southern part of the municipality.
- Crossroads Elementary School serves Junior Kindergarten to Grade 8 students in the northern part of the municipality.
- High school students now take a bus to Laura Secord in St. Catharines or to A.N. Myer in Niagara Falls.

== Economy ==
=== Tourism ===
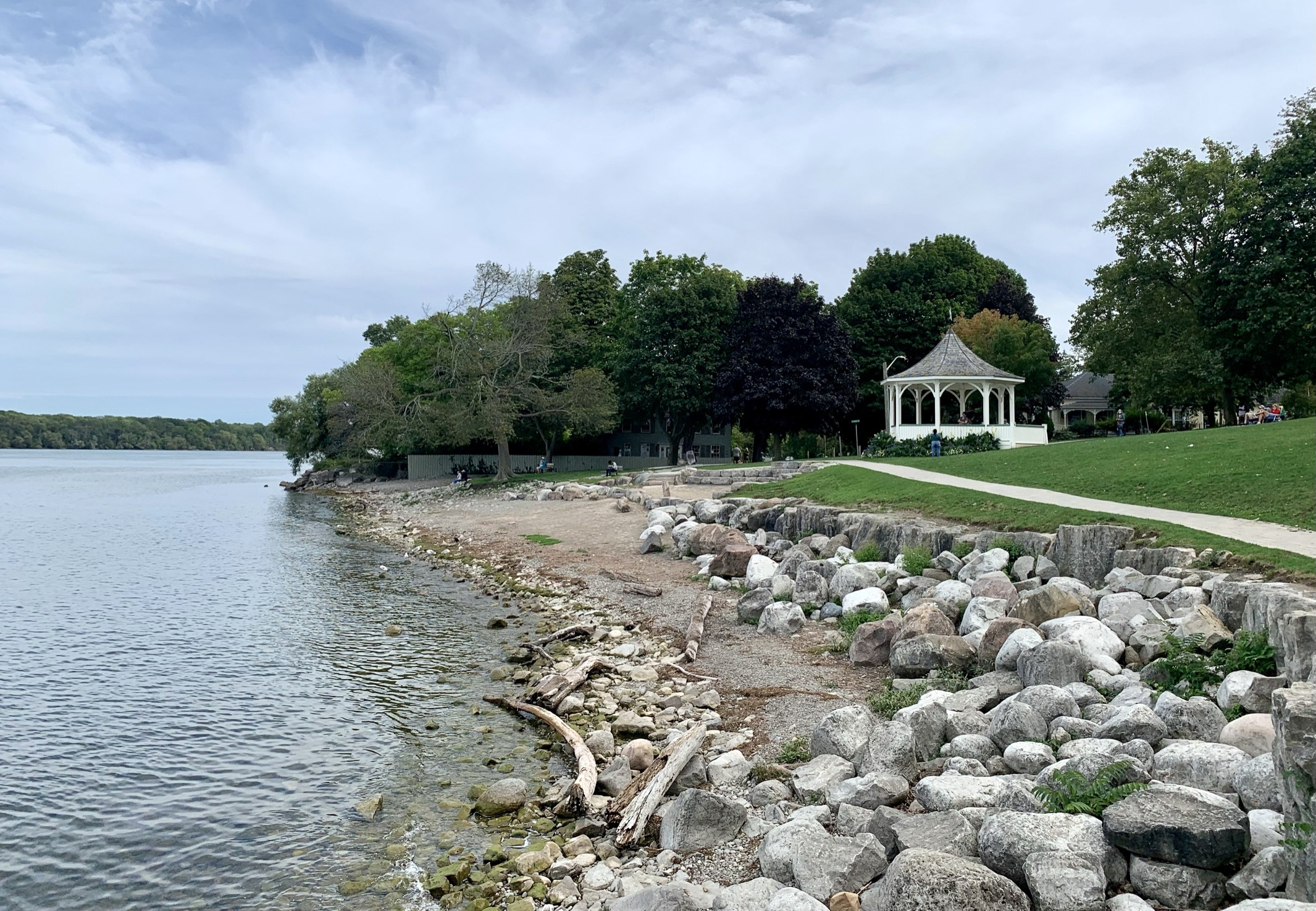
Niagara-on-the-Lake beach, 2021

The town is home to the Shaw Festival, Canada's second largest producing theatre and a repertory company featuring the works of George Bernard Shaw, his contemporaries, or plays about his era (1856–1950), running from April to December. The festival operates four theatres in the centre of town: the Festival, The Jackie Maxwell Studio, The Royal George, and the Court House Theatre. The Festival produces over 750 performances annually, featuring its lauded repertory ensemble and employs over 520 artists, artisans and artsworkers locally.

Along the Niagara Parkway is RiverBrink Art Museum in Queenston. It is home to a collection of over 1,400 artworks and artifacts by Canadian and international artists assembled by Samuel E. Weir. Completed in 1970, the building features Georgian-style architecture, including a mansard roof and gabled windows. It served as Weir's country residence and was converted into an art museum following his death in 1981.

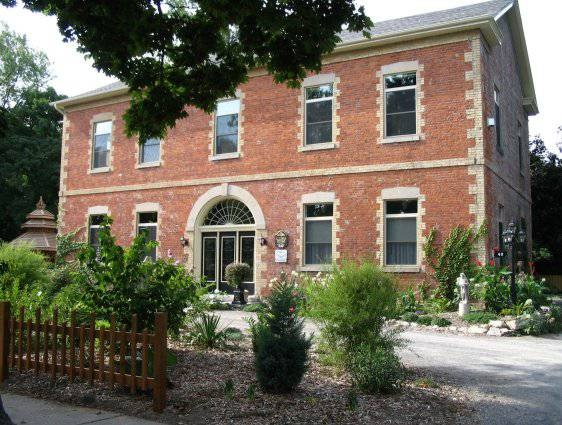
The old Niagara Public School, today a bed and breakfast

Niagara-on-the-Lake is home to many shops, restaurants, wineries, and a growing number of breweries. Historic Old Town is a popular shopping and dining destination. In 2014, Niagara-on-the-Lake also opened an open-air outlet mall, the Outlet Collection at Niagara, which is Canada's largest open-air outlet mall.

=== Film location shooting ===
Films that have used Niagara-on-the-Lake as a filming location include:

- When Michael Calls, also released as Shattered Silence (1972), starring Michael Douglas, Ben Gazzara and Elizabeth Ashley
- The Dead Zone (1983), starring Christopher Walken, Martin Sheen, Brooke Adams and Tom Skerritt
- Samuel Lount (1985)
- The Experts (1989), starring John Travolta, Arye Gross and Kelly Preston
- Trapped in Paradise (1994), starring Nicolas Cage, Dana Carvey and Jon Lovitz
- The Ref (1994), starring Denis Leary, Judy Davis and Kevin Spacey
- Canadian Bacon (1995), starring John Candy, Alan Alda and Rhea Perlman
- That Old Feeling (1997)
- An All American Fairytale (2001)
- Amelia (2009), starring Richard Gere, Hilary Swank, and Ewan McGregor

== Transportation ==
Niagara-on-the-Lake can be reached by the Queen Elizabeth Way, a highway that stretches to Fort Erie to the south, Hamilton to the west and curves around Lake Ontario to Toronto. Public transportation is served by Niagara-on-the-Lake Transit.

== Sports ==
Niagara-on-the-Lake has a long history of recreational boating. There are 2 boat clubs located there. Niagara-on-the-Lake Sailing Club is located at 10 Melville Street, Niagara-On-The-Lake. Smuggler's Cove Boat Club is located at 16001 Niagara River Parkway, Niagara-On-The-Lake.

Niagara-on-the-Lake has a junior men's hockey team, Niagara Predators in the Greater Metro Junior A Hockey League.

The current team was first registered as Toronto Predators from 2013 to 2020 and relocated after the cancelled 2020–2021 season to NOTL to playoff in the Meridian Credit Union arena located in Virgil.

The team replaced the Niagara-on-the-Lake Nationals, which joined as a Junior A team in 2018–2019 sponsored by the local bar Bricks and Barley. The Nationals left the Canadian Premier Junior Hockey League but announced that the team would fold after their first season due to poor attendance, but returned to play the following season.

The Predators play at the 500 seat Meridian Credit Union Arena across from Centennial Sports Park. Built in 2003–2005 the rink has seating and attached to the smaller Centennial Arena built in 1967.

Niagara-on-the-Lake also has a Men's soccer team, the Lakers, which plays in the Peninsula Soccer League (PSL). The team was formed in the 2019 season and sponsored by a local bar, Sand Trap.

Niagara-on-the-Lake also has a rich history in the sport of lacrosse.

== Awards and recognition ==
The Town of Niagara was the site of the 8th World Scout Jamboree in 1955. Over 11,000 Scouts from 71 countries attended the Jamboree. It was the first to be held outside Europe and had the theme "Jamboree of New Horizons." Niagara-on-the-Lake was named the Prettiest Town in Canada in 1996 by Communities in Bloom, a nationwide beautification programme. The town is now a popular tourist destination, located at the northern terminus of the Niagara Parkway, a scenic drive and biking/walking path.

== See also ==
- List of townships in Ontario
