= Niagara District Court House =

Building in Niagara-on-the-Lake, Canada

Coordinates: 43°15′18″N 79°04′19″W

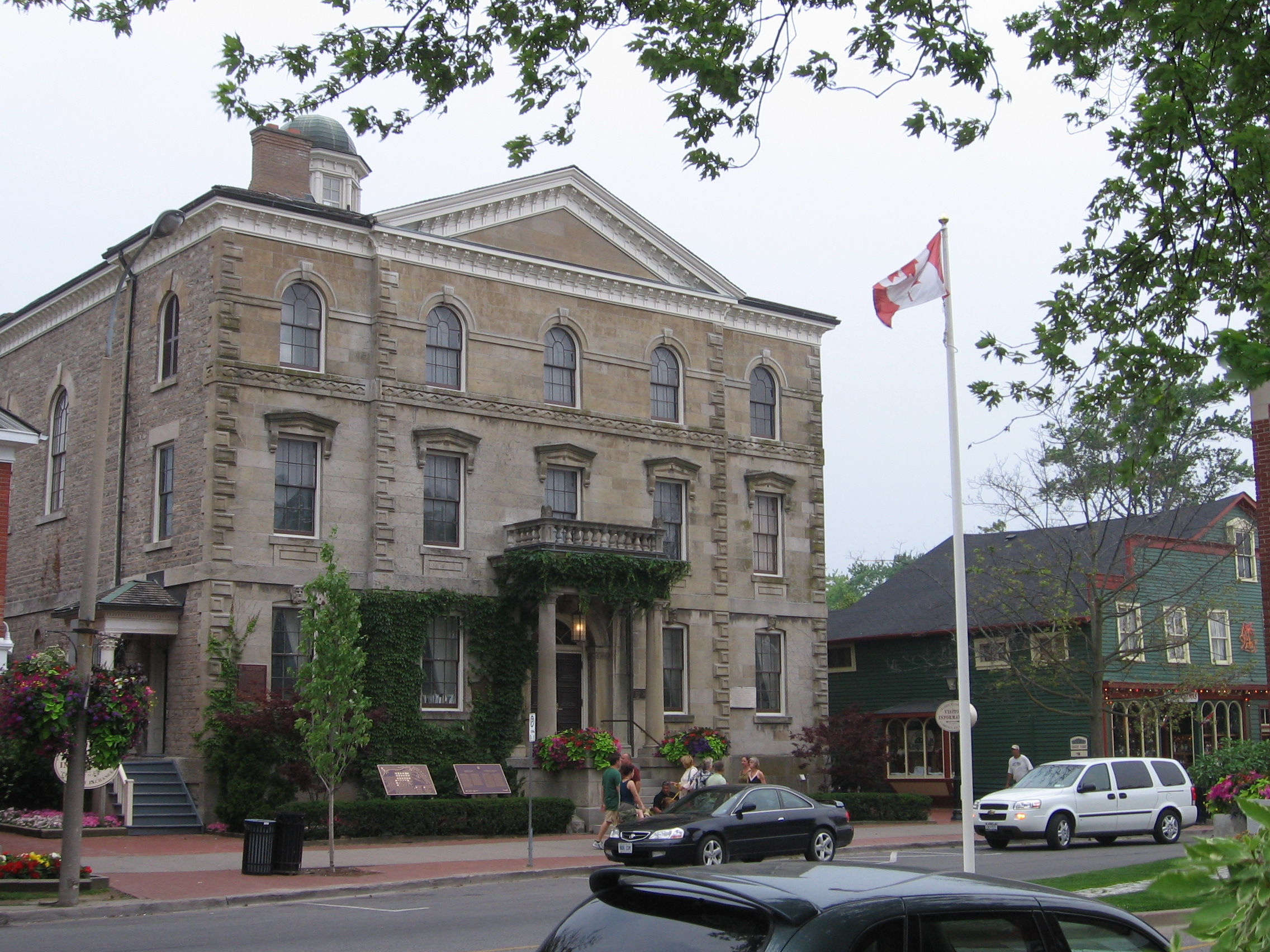
The Court House, a Shaw Festival theatre and Parks Canada headquarters of Niagara National Historic Sites

Niagara District Court House, better known as the Court House Theatre, is a former court house and venue for the Shaw Festival (until 1973) in Niagara-on-the-Lake, Ontario, Canada.

The neo-classical three-storey building was constructed between 1846 and 1847 to designs by the Toronto architect William Thomas (and built by Garvie and Co.) for the then Niagara District. The building replaced an earlier court house removed for fear of it being in-range of cannon fire from Fort Niagara. Inside it had a courtroom, town hall chambers, offices and jail cells.

The building was used as one of a few venues for the 1850 Provincial Agricultural Fair of Canada West. The court-house function remained until judicial courts moved to St. Catharines in 1863; the building then served as town hall and jail until 1866. It became an orphanage for girls from England from 1869 to the early 20th century.

In 1962 the court house became home to the Shaw Festival. It received designation as a National Historic Site in 1981. As of the 2018 season, it was retired as an active performance venue and re-purposed for rehearsals, training, education, and expanded audience programs.

== Prior Niagara court houses ==
- Second Niagara Court House and Gaol – built in 1817 near Rye and Cottage Streets, the Georgian building was more grand than the first and far from cannon fire from the U.S. side of the Niagara River. It was replaced by the 1847 court house. It was demolished after 1866; the site is now Rye Heritage Park, with a marker placed at the end of the driveway into the park.
- First Niagara Court House and Gaol – built in 1795 at King and Prideaux Streets (today occupied by Bernard Gray Hall Bed and Breakfast). Originally the plans were to have it built at Mississauga and Queen Streets. The court house was merely a blockhouse building and was burned by American troops in 1813.
