= Janet Carnochan =

Canadian historian and teacher

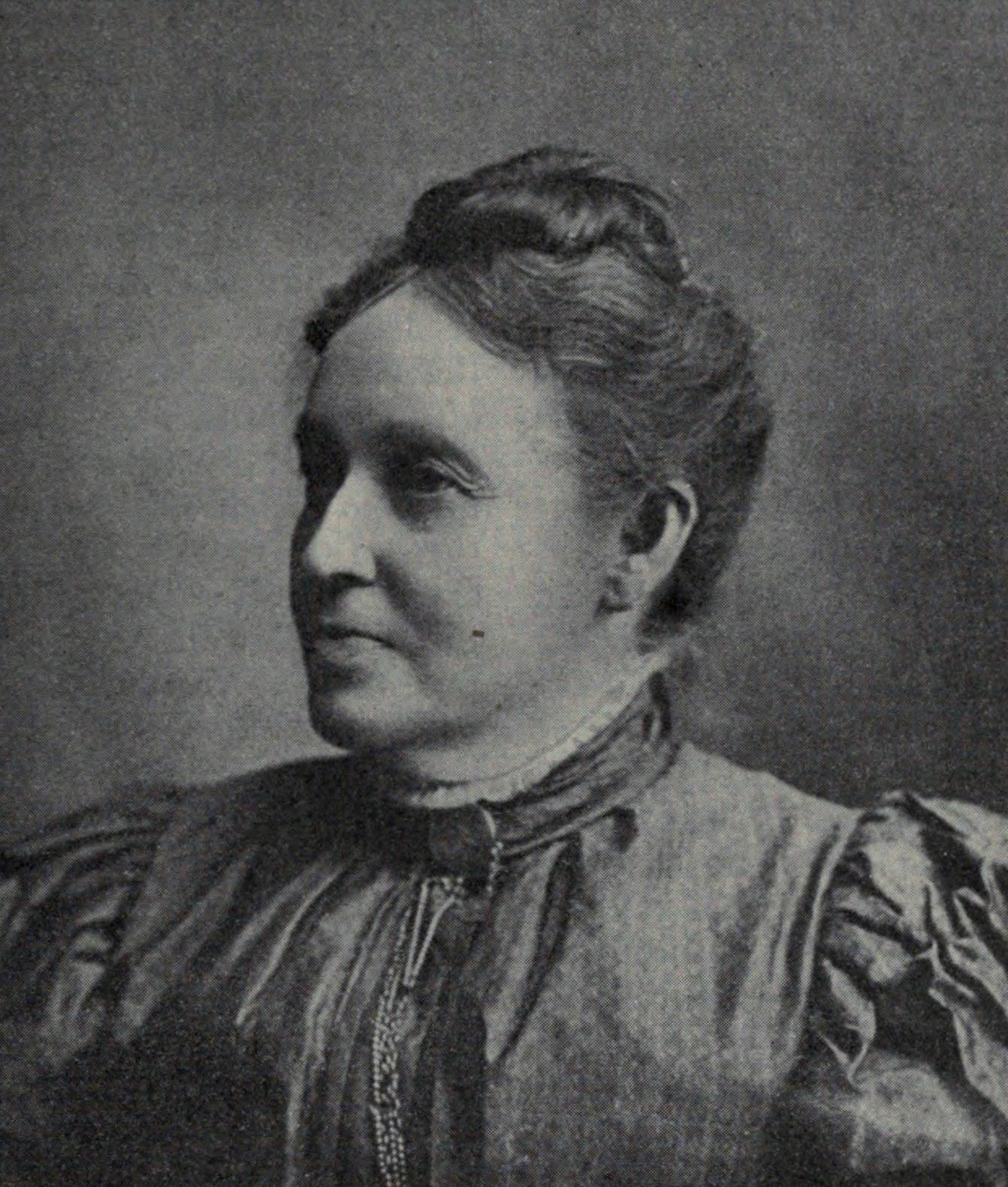
- Janet Carnochan circa January 1912
- Born: November 14, 1839; Stamford Township
- Died: March 31, 1926; Niagara-on-the-Lake
- Occupations: Teacher, historian

Janet Carnochan (November 14, 1839 – March 31, 1926) was a Canadian historian and teacher.

== Early life and education ==
Janet Carnochan was born on November 14, 1839, in Stamford Township, Upper Canada.

Obtaining a first-class county teacher's certificate at age 16, she began teaching immediately. At 18, after attending the Toronto Normal School for five months, she obtained a first-class B certificate.

== Teaching ==
Carnochan worked as a teacher for 39 years. She taught for a short time in Brantford, Ontario, and then for five years in Kingston, Ontario.

From Kingston she went to a school in Peterborough, Ontario, for a year, returning to Niagara-on-the-Lake, Ontario, in 1871. In 1872, she provoked local opposition by becoming "headmaster" of the Niagara Public School. She then became assistant teacher in the Niagara High School, holding that position for 23 years.

== Scholarship ==
In 1895, she founded the Niagara Historical Society. Through appeals to the public and discussions with provincial and federal cabinet ministers, she raised $5,000 for a historical museum at Niagara, of which she became the president and curator. The museum opened in 1907.

Carnochan wrote, entirely or in part, at least 14 of the Niagara Historical Society's publications. Her writings include The History of St. Mark's Church, Niagara, published on the occasion of its centennial in 1892, and a companion, History of St. Andrew's Church, Niagara, also published as a centenary volume in 1894.

Carnochan died on March 31, 1926, in Niagara-on-the-Lake.

== Publications ==
- Niagara One Hundred Years Ago: The Ancient Capital and its Vicinity. Lundy's Lane Historical Society. 1892. OCLC 1049904524.
- Centennial St. Andrew's, Niagara, 1794–1894. William Briggs. 1895. ISBN 978-0-665-00994-5. OCLC 1041795201.
- Niagara Library, 1800 to 1820; Early Schools of Niagara. Niagara Times Presses. 1900. ISBN 978-0-659-11306-1. OCLC 1041803590.
- History of Niagara (In Part). William Briggs. 1914. ISBN 978-0-665-73723-7. OCLC 1046596570.
- Names Only but Much More. Niagara Historical Society. 1915. OCLC 1049882842.

== Sources ==
- Smith, Francis Drake (January 1912). "Miss Janet Carnochan: A Sketch and an Appreciation". Canadian Magazine. 38 (3): 293–297.
