= School of Restoration Arts at Willowbank =

Coordinates: 43.1677°N 79.0579°W

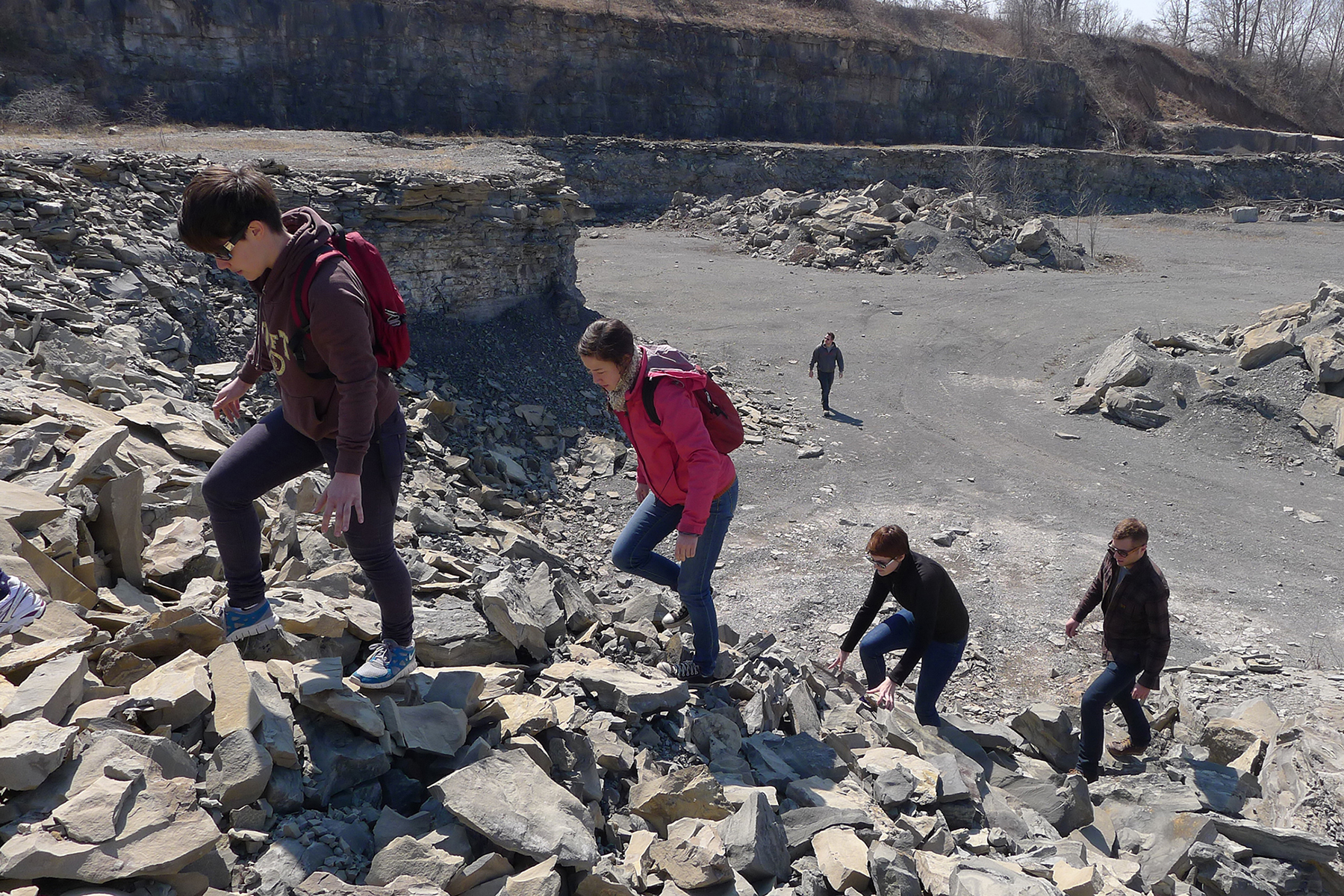
Willowbank diploma students tour the Queenston Quarry, an historic limestone quarry near its campus in Queenston, Ontario.

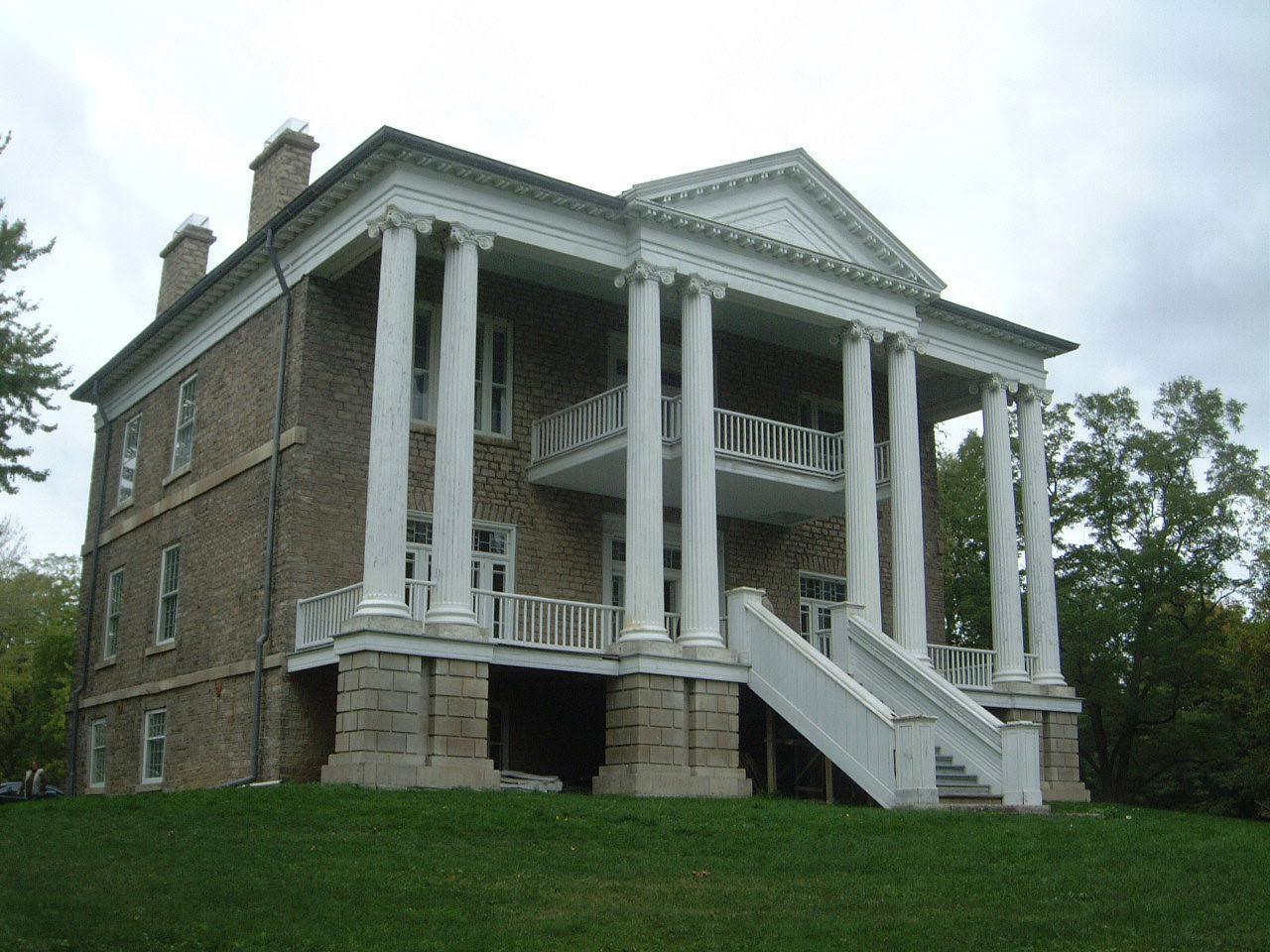
South entrance of the Hamilton House, the central building on campus.

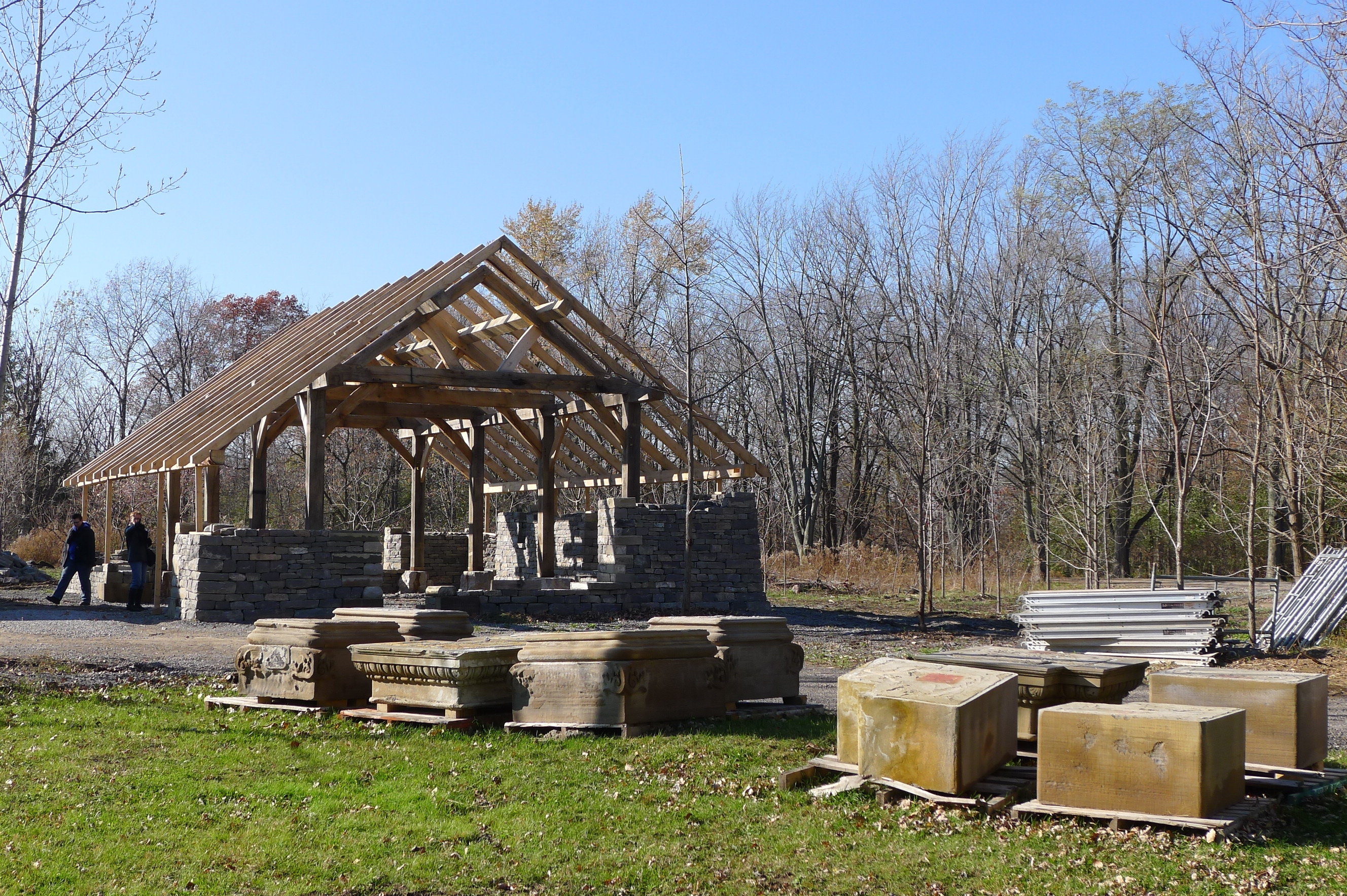
A forge and stone studio under dry stone and timber-frame construction on the Willowbank campus.

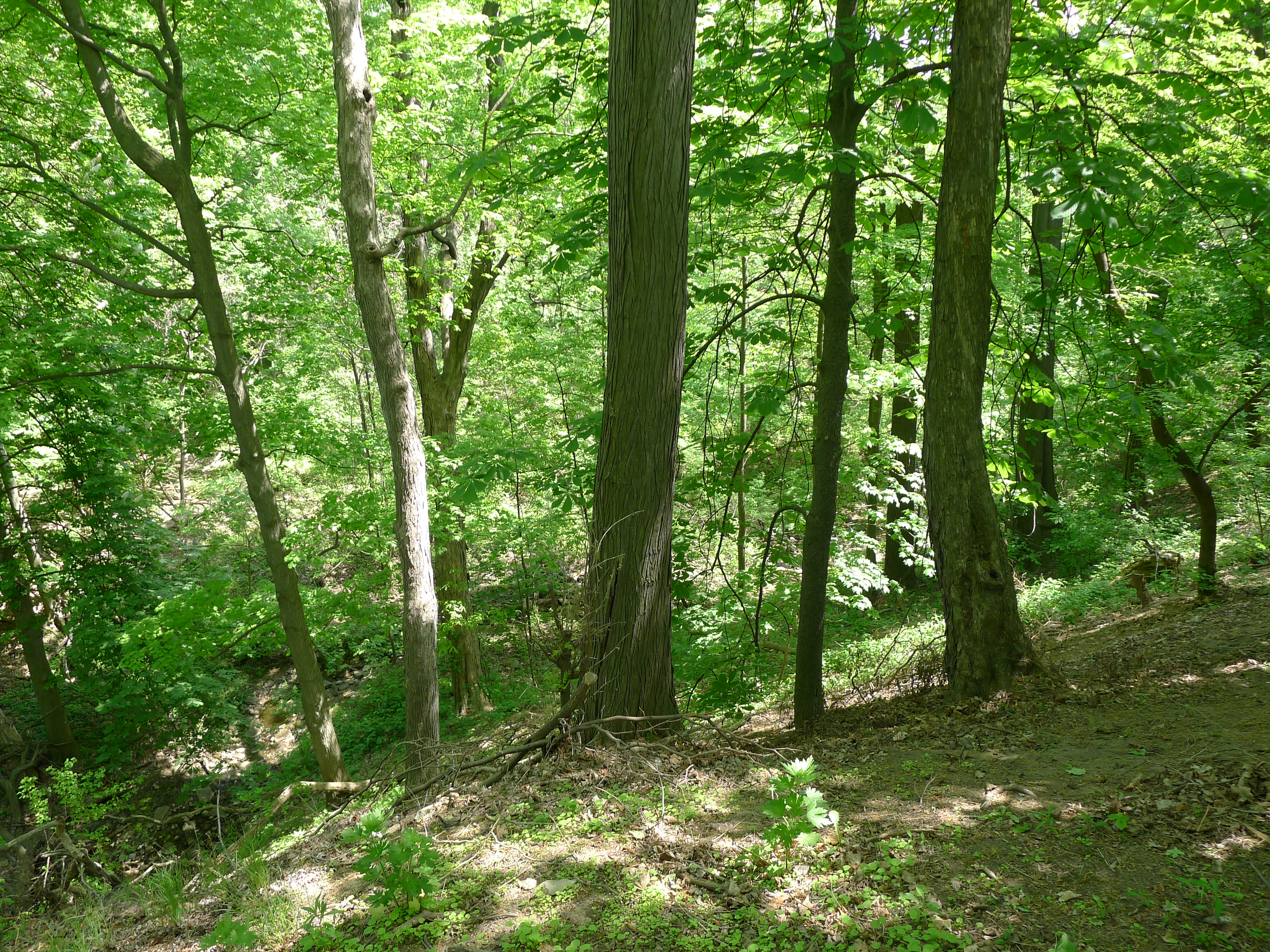
A ravine runs through the Willowbank campus and forms part of the original 19th century estate.

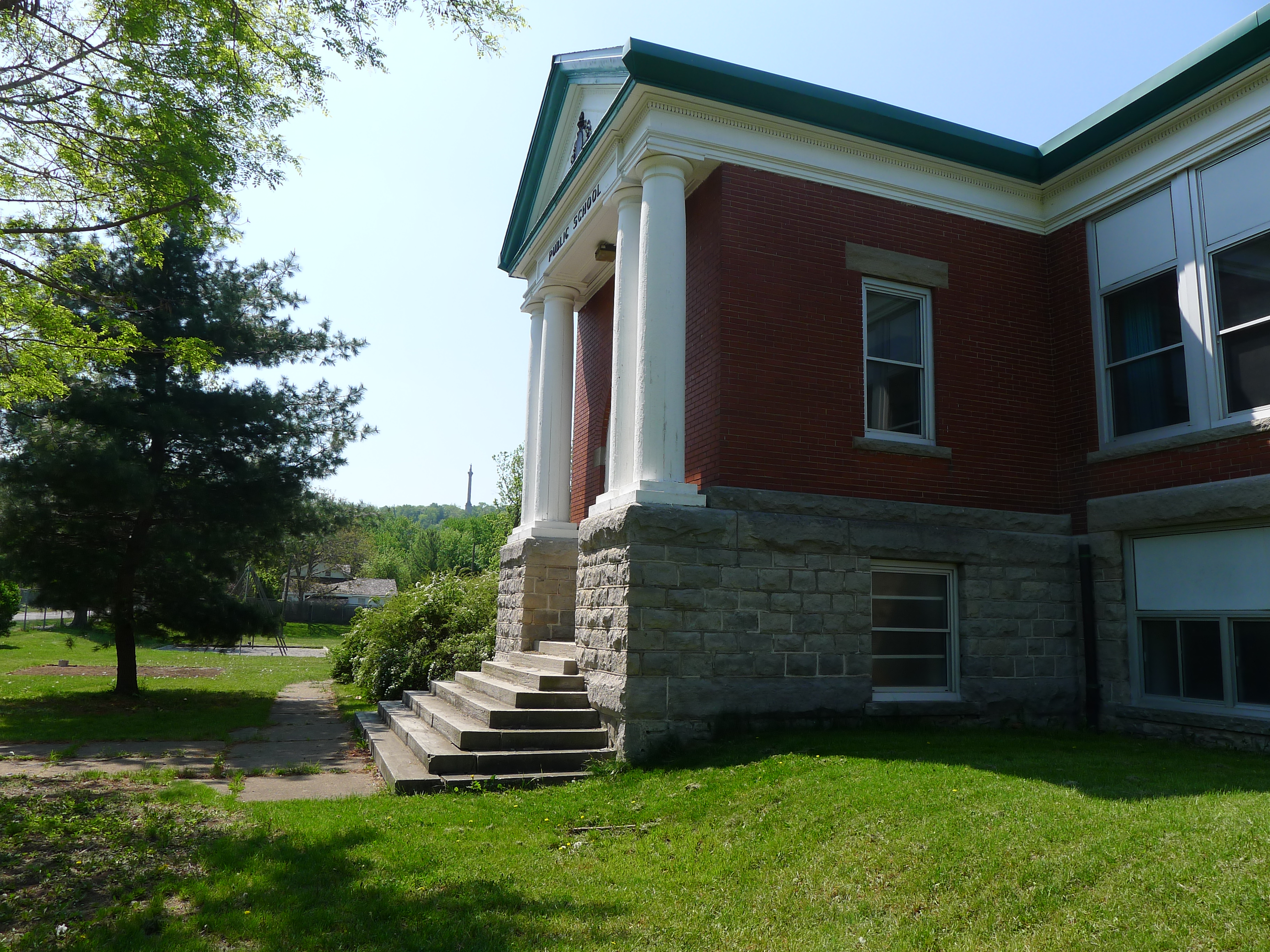
The abandoned Laura Secord School adjacent to the estate has been absorbed by Willowbank and returned in part to the community.

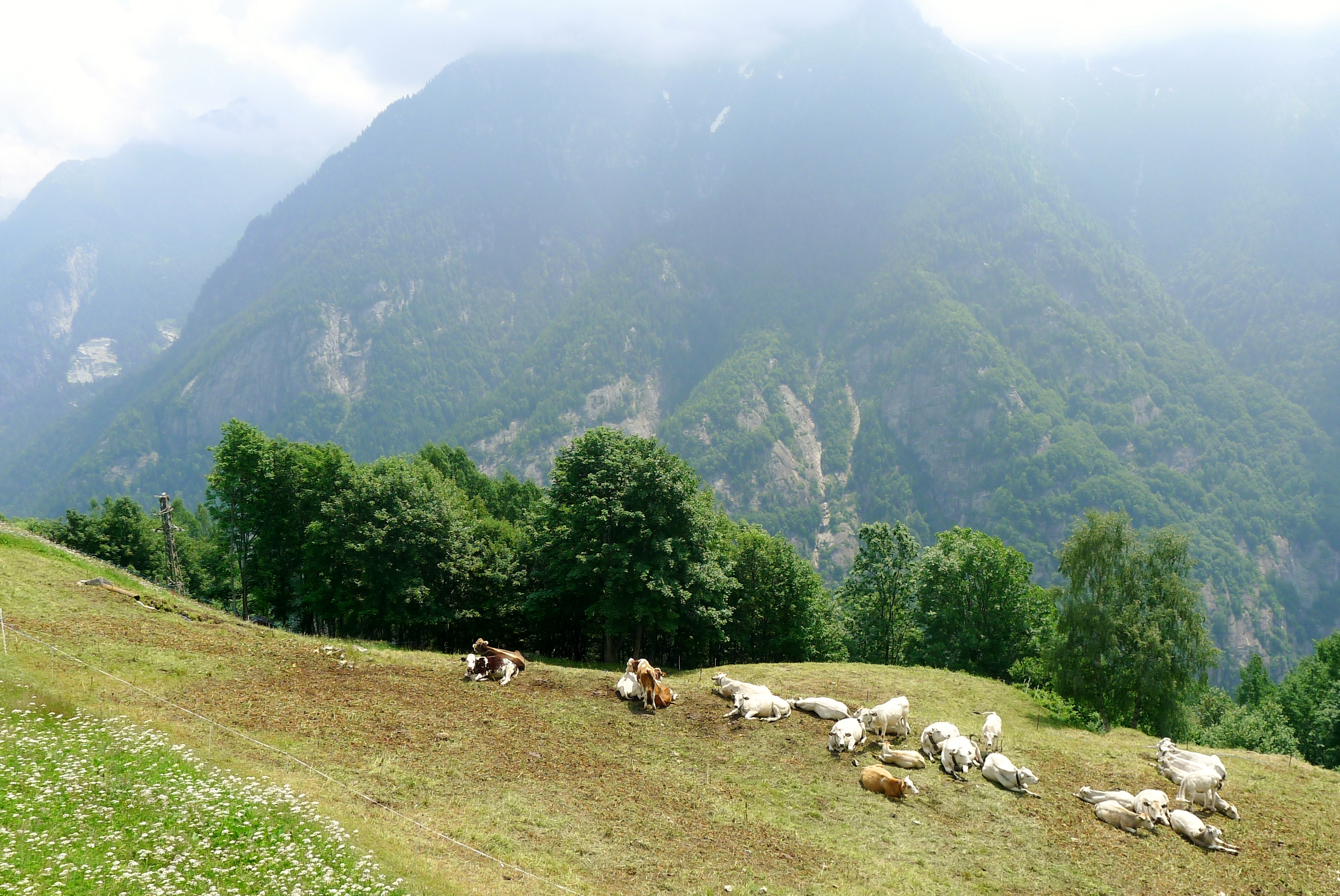
View of the lower Italian Alps, the setting for Willowbank's Field School in the Ossola Valley, Northern Italy.

Willowbank is an independent educational institution located in the Willowbank Estate National Historic Site and in the village centre of Queenston, Ontario, along the Canada–United States border. It operates a School of Restoration Arts which offers a three-year post-secondary diploma in conservation skills and theory, and a Centre for Cultural Landscape, a forum for cultural landscape theory and practice in Canada and the world. Willowbank was created from the rescue of a 19th-century estate which today forms the centre of its campus, and it is one of a handful of Canadian organisations of which Charles III is Royal Patron.

== School of Restoration Arts ==
Founded in 2006, the School of Restoration Arts offers a three-year, post-secondary Diploma in Heritage Conservation which combines academic and apprenticeship learning, taught by over 50 faculty associates who are leading practitioners in the field. The School accepts a maximum of 18 students each year.

The following are examples of courses offered in three primary areas of study:

I. Research and Documentation

- Conservation theory - a cultural landscape approach to understanding and transforming historic places
- Historic research methods - oral and documentary research, identifying social value, sources
- Archaeological research - theoretical and legislative framework
- Architectural history - high style and vernacular architecture, traditions, technologies, styles
- Landscape history – urban and rural landscapes, research and documentation, garden history
- Cultural practice - aboriginal perspectives, tangible and intangible heritage, ecological awareness
- Documentation - measured drawings, hand-drawing, AutoCAD, architectural photography, interpretive recording
- Field investigations - condition analysis, identifying and dating, reporting

II. Planning and Project Management

- Historic structures report - compiling research and documentation findings
- Cultural landscape studies – heritage districts, complex sites, cognitive mapping, artifact and ritual
- Statements of significance - identifying historical, physical and social value, tangible and intangible components, designation options
- Conservation plan - preservation, restoration, rehabilitation and adaptive reuse, contemporary design interventions
- Business models - real estate practice, the restoration economy
- Legal and zoning issues - heritage legislation, building codes, zoning bylaws
- Energy systems - traditional and alternative theory and practice, sustainable design, theoretical and empirical models
- Project and construction management – coordination of specialized materials and skills, interdisciplinary approaches, design-build.

III. Craft and Design Skills

- Stone and mortar - basic geology, quarrying, stone dressing and coursing, stone carving, lime mortars, conservation techniques
- Brick, terra cotta – history, physical and chemical properties, traditional practice, repair, conservation
- Concrete – mass and reinforced concrete, precast, traditional and contemporary practice, patterns of decay, conservation
- Plasters - materials, applications, plain and decorative plaster, cast plaster, conservation, replication
- Wood - species, milling, traditional and alternative tools, carpentry, joinery, doors, windows, repair
- Metals - forge practice, ironwork, sheet metal work, metal repair
- Glass - leaded and stained glass windows, glass replacement, repair and restoration
- Fittings - hardware, traditional and contemporary lighting
- Design – setting parameters, continuity and creativity, design as a material-based and site-based activity, drawing for design
- Conservation science - basic chemistry, environmental issues, artifact care

== Centre for Cultural Landscape ==
The Willowbank Centre for Cultural Landscape is an initiative that builds on its exploration of cultural landscape theory and practice to define a particularly Canadian perspective in this area of current discussion and debate. It facilitates a program of lecture series, workshops and publications to promote a connection between cultural landscape and cultural practice, and to advocate for its ecological view of cultural and natural heritage conservation. The centre also coordinates Willowbank's seat in global deliberations about conservation, whose participants include a cross-section of board, staff and students. In 2013, Willowbank signed an agreement with the UNESCO-affiliated World Heritage Institute in Shanghai, China, with a focus on the UNESCO Recommendation for Historic Urban Landscapes. The centre was created in 2012 through a multi-year grant from the Ontario Trillium Foundation.

== Campus ==
Willowbank's campus is composed of two main parts, a 19th-century estate, and a former village elementary school with its surrounding lands. The former, described in further detail below, traces its history to 8,000 years of human habitation. The landscape of the estate includes a ravine and a hill upon which sits a 19th-century stone mansion. Newly built and re-built outbuildings have been constructed to house student workshops, including a barn and a forge and stone studio.

Adjacent to the estate is the former Laura Secord School in the centre of the village, bought in 2012 by Willowbank after it was abandoned. The transfer is designed to house school activities while also returning the building and lands to community use and creating affordable housing. Its original wing was constructed in 1914, with substantial additions made in the 1950s. The original, two-classroom building housed students upstairs while the lower level was a centre of village life.

== Field School ==
Willowbank runs a three-week field school every summer in partnership with the Canova Association in the Ossola Valley in Northern Italy. The curriculum is a scaled-down version of the school's diploma program, covering cultural landscape theory and practice, as well as documentation and design. The work involves creative restoration and adaptive reuse of abandoned medieval stone structures, carried out under the direction of Italian masons and craftsmen. The field school coincides with the nearby International Architect Encounter, an annual conference of world leaders in conservation and ecological design, with whom the field school's participants are able to engage.

== National Historic Site ==
Willowbank's campus includes a designated National Historic Site in the century estate to which it traces its name, also designated under Part IV of the Ontario Heritage Act, and further protected by a heritage easement granted to The Ontario Heritage Trust. It is named after willow trees that were once located on its grounds, is an example of the rural estates of the wealthy settlers of early 19th century Upper Canada. Its mansion, which is the centre of campus, was built between 1832 and 1834 for Alexander Hamilton, third son of Robert Hamilton, one of the founders of Upper Canada. Constructed in the Greek Revival style of architecture then at its height in North America for such grand houses, Willowbank's is an example of such buildings on the continent. Designed by architect, John Latshaw, and built of local Whirlpool sandstone, the building is characterised by the rare features of eight hand-carved columns running its full two-story height, and by a front doorway of Greek design. The 13-acre estate today forms the centre of the Willowbank campus.

== Royal Patronage ==
Willowbank is devoted to the shift towards a more ecological and sustainable approach to heritage conservation that celebrates the continuity of cultural traditions. My aim is to support and encourage exactly these kinds of approaches in Canada.

— The Prince of Wales to the Globe and Mail, 2014

The Prince of Wales became Royal Patron of Willowbank in 2014, and first met its leaders during his tour of Canada at a meeting of urban designers, planners, developers and civic leaders convened by the prince in Winnipeg, Manitoba. In 2015, Lieutenant Governor Elizabeth Dowdeswell, the Queen's representative in Ontario, visited Willowbank.
