= Willowbank Estate =

Mansion in Queenston, Ontario, Canada

Coordinates: 43.16773°N 79.05796°W

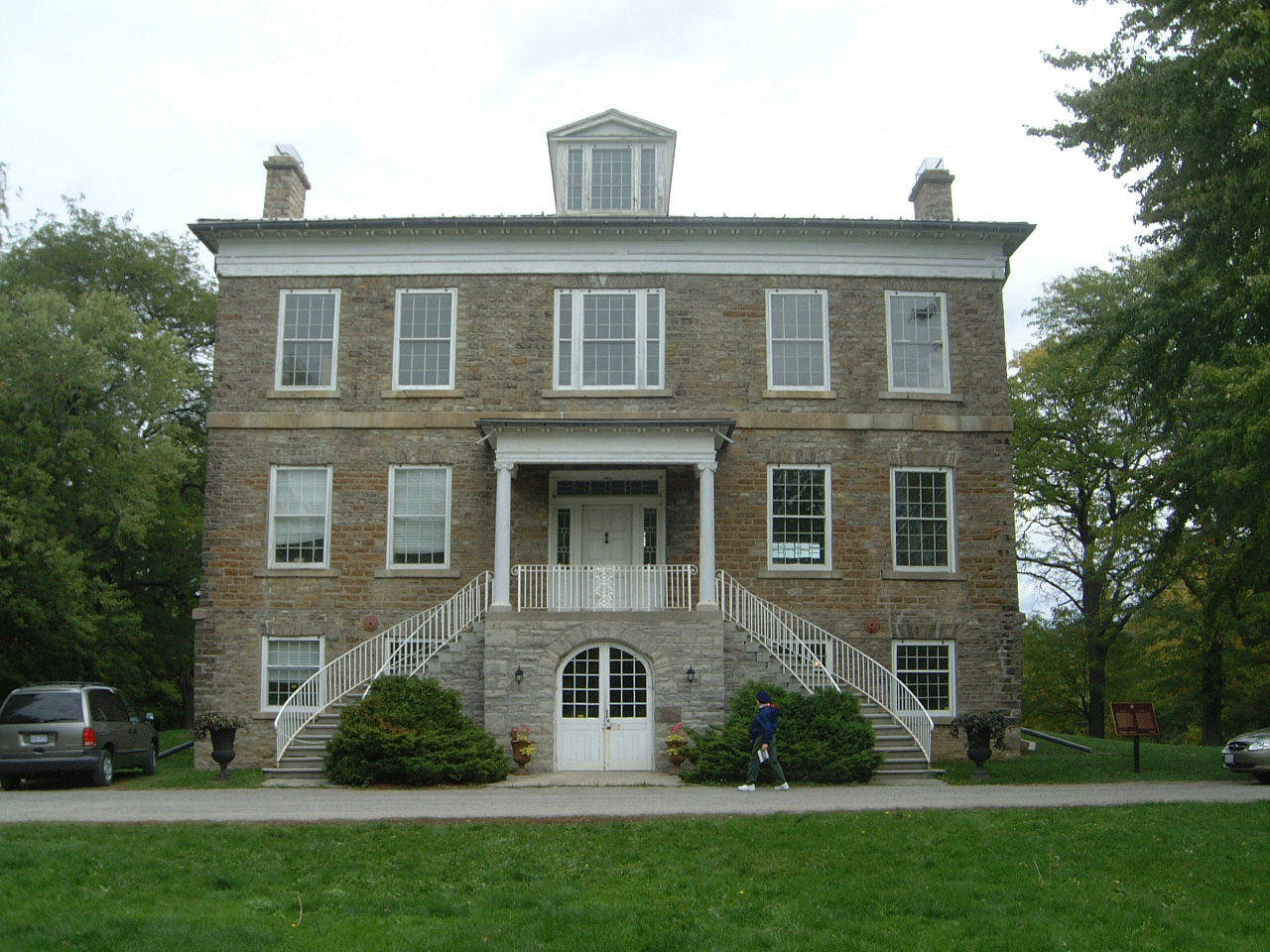

General information
- Architectural style: Classical Revival
- Location: 14487 Niagara Parkway, Queenston, Ontario, Canada
- Completed: 1836
- Owner: School of Restoration Arts

Design and construction
- Architect: Alfred Boultbee
- Main contractor: John Latshaw

Website
- http://www.willowbank.ca/

National Historic Site of Canada
- Official name: Willowbank Estate
- Designated: March 5, 2004

Ontario Heritage Act
- Official name: Willowbank Estate
- Designated: September 29, 2005

Willowbank is a historic mansion in Queenston, Ontario, Canada. Originally a residential mansion, it currently houses the School of Restoration Arts at Willowbank.

== History ==
Willowbank is a National Historic Site of Canada. It possesses in its exterior architecture and landscape the qualities of the Romantic fusion of Classical Revival architecture and the Picturesque style of landscaping.

Willowbank is named after magnificent willow trees that once graced its grounds; it is an elegant example of the rural estates of the wealthy settlers of early 19th century Upper Canada. The mansion was built between 1834 and 1836 for Alexander Hamilton, sheriff of the Niagara District. Alexander Hamilton was the third son of the Honourable Robert Hamilton, one of the founders of Upper Canada. Constructed in the Classical Revival style of architecture then at its height in North America for such grand houses, Willowbank is regarded as one of the finest remaining examples of such buildings on the continent.

Designed by architect Alfred Boultbee, built by John Latshaw of local Whirlpool Sandstone, the building is characterized by eight hand-carved columns running its full two-story height, and by a front doorway considered to be a masterpiece of Ionic design.

The mansion is set in a picturesque landscape which, like the exterior of the building, is designated and has remained essentially unchanged. The house sits prominently on its lawn hillside, overlooking the village of Queenston. Viewing Willowbank from the base of the slope, one sees the thick foliage of untended trees which surround the large, tended lawn. The old carriageway winds up the slope, allowing only glimpses of the building until it comes into full view. Individual trees are interspersed in an unplanned fashion on the largely open lawn of the estate. There appear to be no prescribed garden features in the landscape; the existing natural state of the property was used to create the setting.

Willowbank is well protected from inappropriate alteration to the exterior of the building and its landscape, by legislation. It is designated under Part IV of the Ontario Heritage Act, it is a designated National Historic Site, and is further protected by a heritage easement granted to The Ontario Heritage Trust.

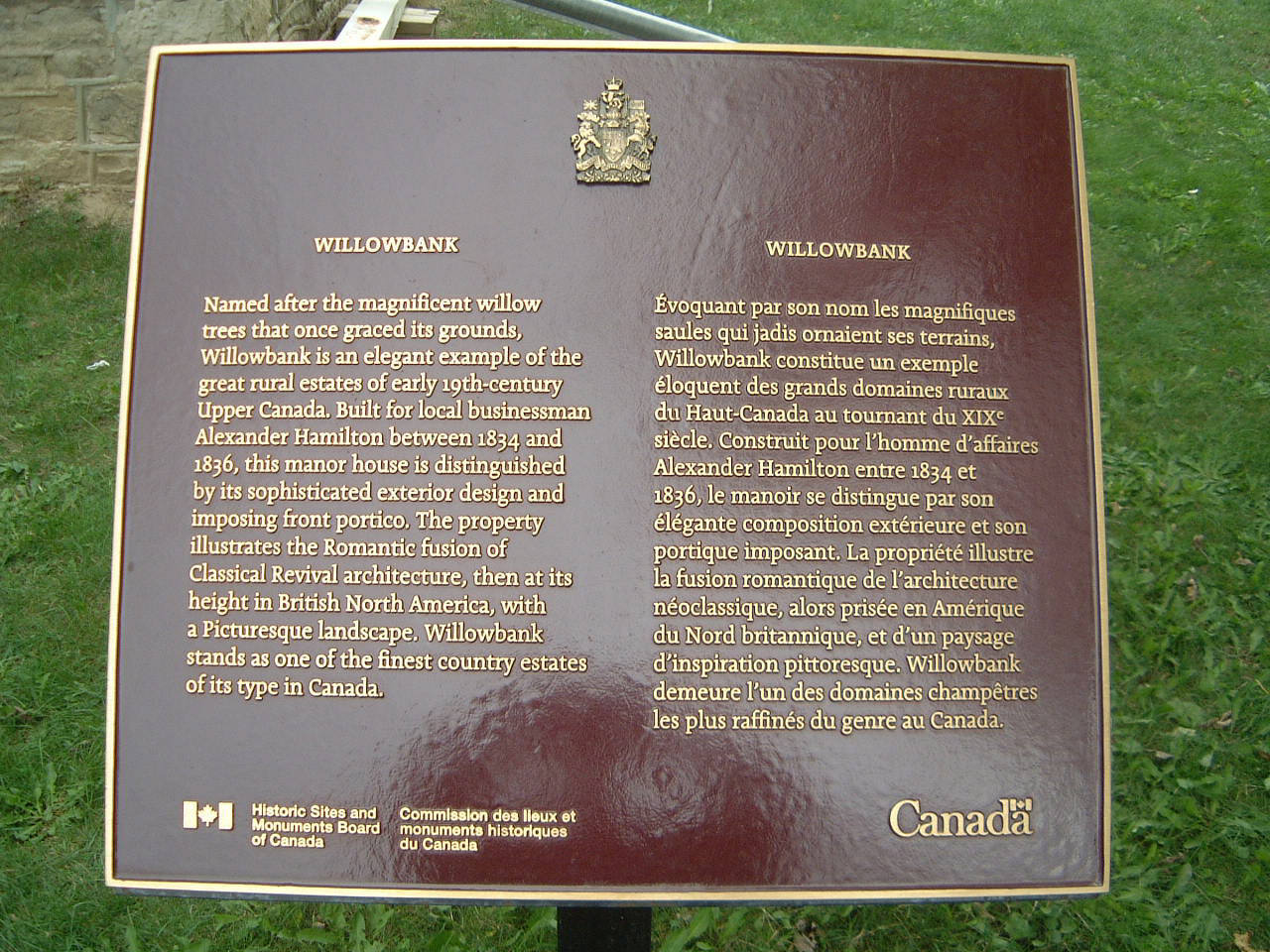
Willowbank plaque

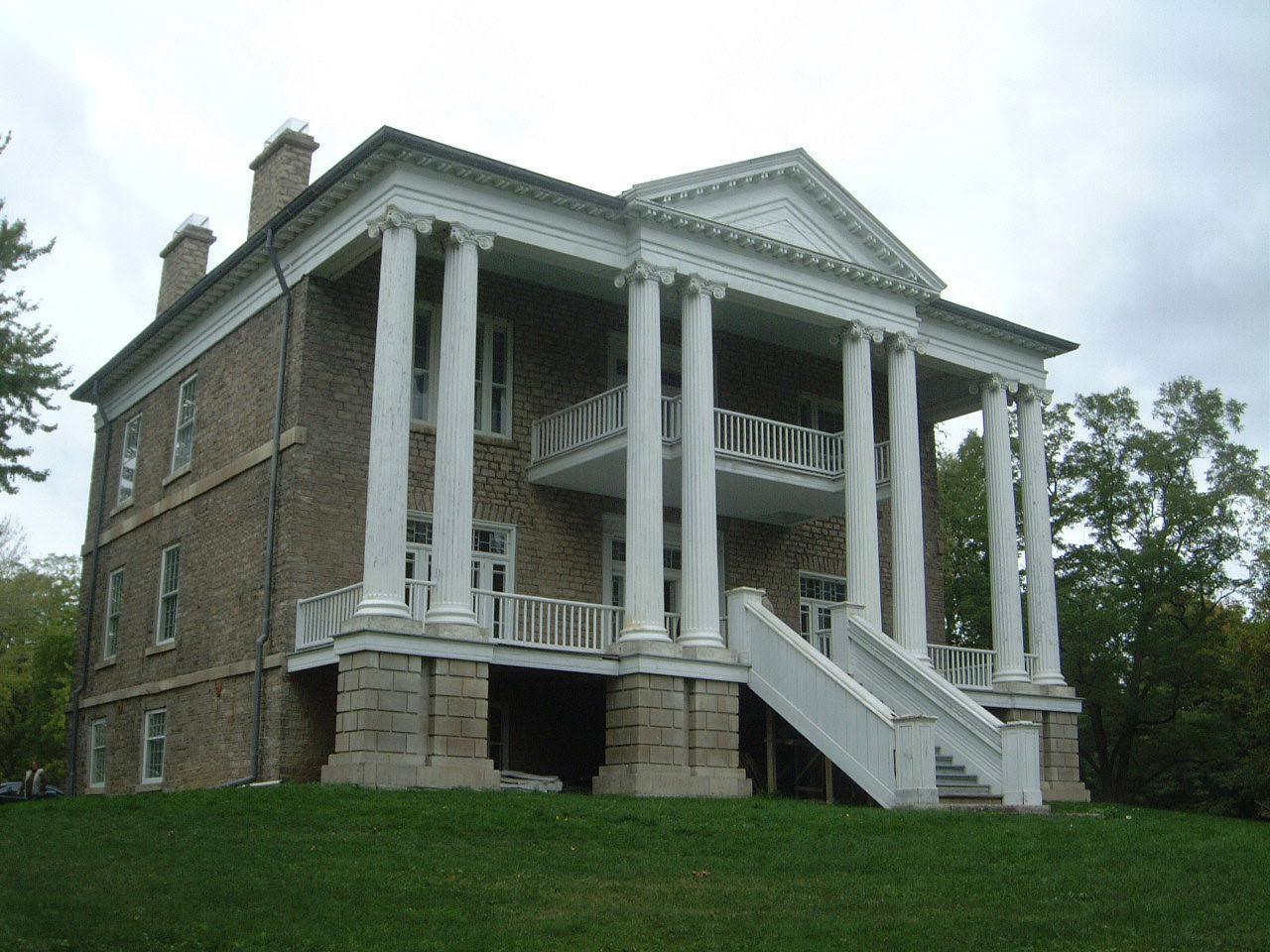
Willowbank back side

== School of Restoration Arts ==
The School of Restoration Arts is dedicated to the teaching of all arts and skills related to restoration of built heritage, and uses historic buildings in need of restoration as the teaching venues. Willowbank will be the first 'workshop' of the building-cum-schools and will serve as the School's headquarters after restoration is complete.

== Tours and events ==
Willowbank is open to the public for tours through the summer months and September to May by appointment. Willowbank is also available to the community as a rental facility for conferences, meetings and formal gatherings. Cultural and heritage events allow Willowbank to showcase the broad spectrum of musical and creative talents that abound in the Niagara Region.
