= List of National Historic Sites of Canada in Niagara Region =

This is a list of National Historic Sites (French: Lieux historiques nationaux) in Niagara Region, Ontario. There are 26 National Historic Sites designated in Niagara, of which nine are administered by Parks Canada (identified below by the beaver icon).

Numerous National Historic Events also occurred in the Niagara Region, and are identified at places associated with them, using the same style of federal plaque which marks National Historic Sites. Several National Historic Persons are commemorated throughout the region in the same way. The markers do not indicate which designation—a Site, Event, or Person—a subject has been given.

National Historic Sites located elsewhere in Ontario are listed at National Historic Sites in Ontario.

This list uses the designation names as recognized by the national Historic Sites and Monuments Board, not necessarily the official or colloquial names of the sites.

== National Historic Sites ==
Media related to National Historic Sites of Canada in Ontario at Wikimedia Commons

Site	Date(s)	Designated	Location	Description	Image
Battle of Beaver Dams	1813 (battle)	1921	Thorold; 43.117776°N 79.185419°W	The site of a decisive British victory during the War of 1812, after heroine Laura Secord had earlier struck out on a long and difficult trek to warn the British of an impending American attack	Painting of Laura Secord warning Lieutenant James Fitzgibbon of an impending American attack
Battle of Chippawa	1814 (battle)	1921	Chippawa; 43.052127°N 79.024720°W	The site of a battle that took place during the War of 1812 as a result of the last major American invasion of Canada	Painting of American General Winfield Scott leading his infantry brigade forward during the Battle of Chippawa
Battle of Cook's Mills	1814 (battle)	1921	Cooks Mills; 42.997895°N 79.174913°W	The site of the last engagement between U.S. and British/Canadian armies fought in Niagara, and second-last on Canadian soil during the War of 1812	View of the monument at the site of the Battle of Cook's Mills
Battle of Lundy's Lane	1814 (battle)	1937	Niagara Falls; 43.089152°N 79.095456°W	The site of a spontaneous confrontation between the British and American forces in which the British attacked American forces returning from the Battle of Chippawa; the six-hour-long battle was one of the bloodiest battles of the War of 1812 and marked the end of American offensive in Upper Canada	Painting of British infantry at the Battle of Lundy's Lane
Battlefield of Fort George	1813 (battle)	1921	Niagara-on-the-Lake; 43°15.722′N 79°05.071′W	The site of one of the fiercest battles of the War of 1812, in which the U.S. managed to gain a toehold on the Niagara Peninsula; distinct from nearby Fort George National Historic Site	
Butler's Barracks	1814–54 (completed)	1963	Niagara-on-the-Lake; 43.248370°N 79.074044°W	A complex of five wooden buildings, built by the British after the War of 1812 and occupied as a military camp until the 1960s, representing 150 years of military history	A view of Butler's Barracks among a grove of trees
Former L.J. Shickluna Service Station	1924 (c.) (completed)	1995	Port Colborne; 42.887941°N 79.251214°W	Early Spanish Colonial Revival-style service station; symbol of rapid post-World War I automobile culture	
Fort Drummond	1814 (completed)	1928	Niagara-on-the-Lake; 43.160147°N 79.052234°W	A redoubt and battery constructed during the War of 1812 to protect the main portage road from Chippawa to Queenston, named after Sir Gordon Drummond; some walls of the redoubt are still extant	
Fort Erie	1808 (completion of third Fort Erie)	1933	Fort Erie (town); 42°53′35.70″N 78°55′25.74″W	The first British fort to be constructed as part of a network developed after the Seven Years' War in the western portion of the Province of Quebec (later Upper Canada); captured and destroyed in 1814 by invading American forces during the War of 1812, the remains of the fort were rebuilt by the Niagara Parks Commission in 1937–39	Fort Erie
Fort George	1799 (completed), 1940 (reconstruction completed)	1921	Niagara-on-the-Lake; 43°15′03″N 79°03′40″W	Reconstructed British fort that served as the principal fortification on the Niagara Peninsula during the War of 1812; distinct from the nearby Battlefield of Fort George National Historic Site	Fort George
Fort Mississauga	1814 (completed)	1960	Niagara-on-the-Lake; 43°15′42″N 79°04′36″W	Located in a strategic position at the mouth of the Niagara River to protect the Canadian frontier and to counter Fort Niagara on the U.S. side, it is the only remaining fortification of its type (a square tower within a star-shaped earthwork) in Canada	Entrance to Fort Mississauga
Frenchman's Creek	1812 (battle)	1921	Fort Erie; 42.94227°N 78.92645°W	The battle of Frenchman’s Creek was a minor skirmish in the War of 1812, where British forces pushed an American advance parties back across the Niagara River; the failure of American troops contributed, in part, to the cancellation of the larger invasion planned for the Niagara peninsula at the end of 1812	Sketch of British soldiers circa 1812-4
Mississauga Point Lighthouse	1804 (completed), 1814 (demolished)	1937	Niagara-on-the-Lake; 43°15′41.92″N 79°4′35.86″W	The first lighthouse on the Great Lakes, constructed in 1804 by the military masons of the 49th Regiment of Foot, it was damaged in the Battle of Fort George in 1813, and demolished in 1814 when the British built Fort Mississauga on the site	Sketch of British soldiers circa 1812-4
Navy Island	1761 (shipyard established)	1921	Niagara Falls; 43°3′23.07″N 79°0′38.1″W	Archaeological remains on an uninhabited island on the Ontario side of the Niagara River; during the 1760s, the island was home to the first British shipyard to serve the Upper Great Lakes and, during the Upper Canada Rebellion, the seat of William Lyon Mackenzie’s exiled government, the Republic of Canada	Map showing location of Navy Island
Niagara Apothecary	1820 (completed)	1968	Niagara-on-the-Lake; 43°15′18.25″N 79°4′15.3″W	A white, single-storey clapboard Georgian building on Niagara-on-the-Lake’s main commercial street, it served as an apothecary/pharmacy from approximately 1866 to 1964 and it is one of the very few remaining examples of an old apothecary shop	Exterior view of the Niagara Apothecary
Niagara District Court House	1847 (completed)	1980	Niagara-on-the-Lake; 43°15′18.25″N 79°4′15.3″W	Designed by William Thomas in the Neoclassical style, it is an excellent example of a mid-19th-century multipurpose civic structure, originally containing the local court house, jail, market and town hall	Exterior view of the Niagara District Court House
Niagara-on-the-Lake	1815–59 (completed)	2003	Niagara-on-the-Lake; 43°15′18.02″N 79°4′18.6″W	An early-19th-century Loyalist town located on the southern shore of Lake Ontario; the historic district covers 25 city blocks and contains the best collection of buildings in Canada from the period following the War of 1812	Exterior view of the main commercial street in Niagara-on-the-Lake
Point Abino Light Tower	1918 (completed)	1998	Crystal Beach; 42°50′7.85″N 79°5′42.64″W	A lighthouse situated at the eastern end of Lake Erie; intended to complement the summer homes nearby, it was more elaborately designed than most Canadian lighthouses, with a high level of its features still intact	Exterior view of the white, square-base tower.
Queenston Heights	1812 (battle)	1968	Niagara-on-the-Lake; 43.160147°N 79.052234°W	A treed promontory on the Niagara Escarpment, where the British repulsed an American invasion in the Battle of Queenston Heights in the War of 1812; site of Brock's Monument and a monument to Laura Secord	View of Brock's Monument at Queenston Heights in 1920
Queenston-Chippawa Hydro-electric Plant	1925 (completed)	1990	Niagara-on-the-Lake; 43°8′45.47″N 79°2′43.55″W	At the time of its completion, it was the first large-scale hydroelectric generation project in the world	Aerial view of the Adam Beck/Queenston-Chppawa Hydro Plant
R. Nathaniel Dett British Methodist Episcopal Church	1836 (completed)	1999	Niagara Falls; 43°5′16.1″N 79°5′14.95″W	A British Methodist Episcopal Church chapel named after and associated with the formative years of composer Robert Nathaniel Dett; representative of early black settlement in the Niagara area and the church's role in assisting Underground Railroad refugees	Image of R. Nathaniel Dett
Ridgeway Battlefield	1866 (battle)	1921	Fort Erie; 42.904349°N 79.041642°W	The site of the battlefield where the Queen’s Own Rifles, 13th Hamilton Battalion, and Caledonia and York Rifle Companies of Haldimand defended Canada against Fenian raiders from the United States	1869 painting of the Battle of Ridgeway
Salem Chapel, British Methodist Episcopal Church	1855 (completed)	1999	St. Catharines; 43°9′54.71″N 79°14′24.16″W	A gable-fronted church representative of the auditory-hall design of Underground Railroad-related churches; an important centre of 19th-century abolitionist activity in Canada, associated with Harriet Tubman	Salem Chapel
Toronto Power Generating Station	1913 (completed)	1983	Niagara Falls; 43°4′19.45″N 79°4′25.74″W	A generating station to supply hydro-electric power to Toronto, it was the first wholly Canadian-owned hydro-electric facility at Niagara Falls; an elegant and unusual application of Beaux-Arts design to an industrial site in Canada	Exterior view of part of the Toronto Power Generating Station
Willowbank	1836 (completed)	2003	Niagara-on-the-Lake; 43.16773°N 79.05796°W	A 5-hectare (12-acre) estate with a large 3 1/2-storey temple-fronted mansion; the landscaping and largely unchanged exterior architecture are symbolic of the fusion of Neoclassical architecture and the Picturesque ideal that characterized large country estates of Upper Canada in the early 19th century	Exterior view of Willowbank mansion
Vrooman's Battery	1812 (battle)	1921	Niagara-on-the-Lake; 43°10′41.76″N 79°3′30.05″W	An artillery battery that maintained a harassing fire on the American forces crossing the Niagara River during the Battle of Queenston Heights in the War of 1812; now consists of a mound on the riverbank	

== See also ==
- Niagara Peninsula
- Neutral Nation
