= Fort Drummond (Queenston Heights) =

Coordinates: 43.160147°N 79.052234°W

- Type: Redoubt and battery from the War of 1812
- Location: Ontario, Canada
- Built: 1814
- Governing body: Parks Canada
- Website: Fort Drummond

National Historic Site of Canada

Fort Drummond was the site of a redoubt and battery from the War of 1812 and located within Queenston Heights.

The U-shaped structure was an earthworks rather than a wood, brick or rock construction.

Built in 1814 by the British Army and named for Sir Gordon Drummond, it was occupied by the Americans for two weeks in July 1814 during the Battle of Chippawa. It was later re-taken by the British.

A wading pond, added in the 1920s and replaced in 1967, is located within the site. The walls of the redoubt can still be seen.

Other fortifications are located nearby, since the area was close to the border with the United States:

- Fort Mississauga (1814–1816)
- Fort George, Ontario (1802)
