= John Butler (Ranger) =

American-born military officer and colonial official (1728–1796)

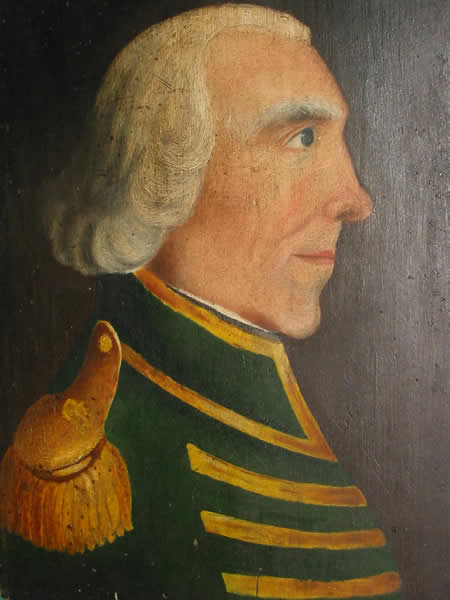
- Portrait of John Butler by Henry Oakley, 1834
- Born: c. April 28, 1728; New London, Connecticut Colony
- Died: May 12, 1796; Newark, Upper Canada
- Military career
- Allegiance: Great Britain
- Branch: British Indian Department; Tryon County militia British Army
- Service years: 1755–1784
- Rank: Lieutenant-Colonel
- Units: Butler's Rangers
- Conflicts: French and Indian War: Battle of Ticonderoga; Battle of Fort Frontenac; Battle of Fort Niagara; American Revolutionary War: Battle of Longue-Pointe; Siege of Fort Stanwix; Battle of Oriskany; Battle of Wyoming; Battle of Newtown; Battle of Klock's Field

Lieutenant-Colonel John Butler (c. April 28, 1728 – May 12, 1796) was a British Indian Department officer, landowner and merchant. During the American Revolutionary War, he was a prominent Loyalist who commanded Butler's Rangers. Born in New London, Connecticut, he moved to New York with his family, where he learned several Iroquoian languages and worked as an interpreter in the fur trade. He was well-prepared to work with the Mohawk and other Iroquois nations who became allies of the British during the rebellion.

During the Revolutionary War, Butler persuaded the Seneca and Cayuga to participate in the St. Leger's Expedition in New York. Afterwards he was given permission to raise a "corps of rangers" to work closely with Britain's Indigenous allies. Butler's Rangers participated in raids in New York and Pennsylvania, including the Battle of Wyoming and the Cherry Valley massacre. After the war Butler resettled in Upper Canada, where he was given a grant of land by the Crown for his services. Butler continued his leadership in the developing colony, serving in public office, and helping to establish the Anglican Church and the Masonic Order in what is now Ontario.

== Early life ==
John Butler, the son of Walter Butler and Deborah Ely, was born in 1728 in New London, Connecticut. In 1742, his father moved the family to Fort Hunter on the frontier in the Mohawk Valley near the modern village of Fonda, New York. John married Catharine (Catalyntje) Bradt of Dutch ancestry about 1752. The couple raised five children including Walter Butler. Two others died in infancy. Having learned several Iroquoian languages, Butler was frequently employed as an interpreter in the lucrative fur trade.

== French and Indian War ==
In 1755, John Butler was appointed to the rank of lieutenant in the British Indian Department. He served in the French and Indian War under Sir William Johnson and was promoted to captain. In 1758, he saw action with James Abercromby at Fort Ticonderoga and John Bradstreet at the Battle of Fort Frontenac. In 1759, he served under Johnson as second-in-command of the Indigenous forces at the Battle of Fort Niagara, where he played a crucial role in flanking the French reinforcements. In 1760, he continued as second-in-command of the Indigenous warriors in Jeffery Amherst's force during the capture of Montreal.

== Pre-American Revolution years ==
After the war, Butler returned to the Mohawk Valley in New York. He acquired more land, building an estate of 26,000 acres (11,000 ha) at Butlersbury near the major Mohawk village of Caughnawaga. He was second only to Sir William Johnson, British Superintendent of Indian Affairs, as a wealthy frontier landowner, and worked under Johnson for the British Indian Department. In 1772, Butler was appointed a judge in the Tryon County court and was commissioned Lieutenant Colonel of Guy Johnson's regiment of Tryon County militia. Butler was elected as one of the two members representing Tryon County in the New York assembly.

== American Revolutionary War ==
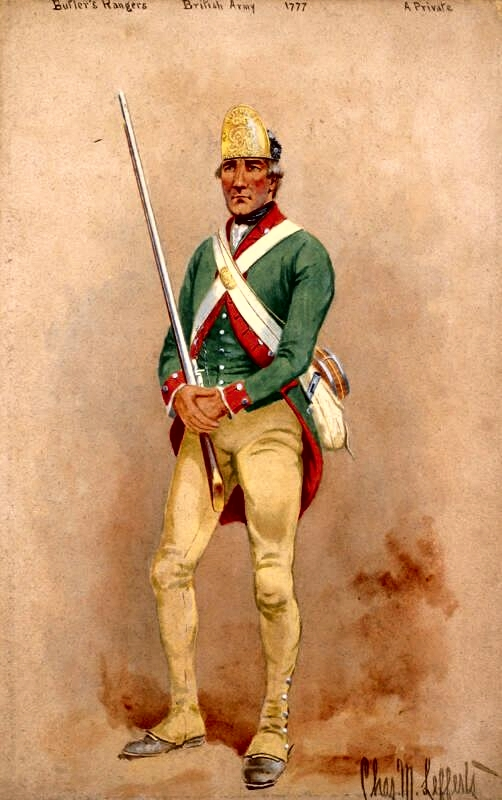
Uniform of Butler's Rangers

John Butler returned to service, as a Loyalist, when the American Revolution turned to war in 1775. In May 1775, he left for Canada in the company of Daniel Claus, Walter Butler, Hon Yost Schuyler and Joseph Brant, a Mohawk leader. On July 7, they reached Fort Oswego and in August, Montreal. Butler participated in the defence of Montreal against an attack led by Ethan Allen. In November, Guy Carleton, Governor of the Province of Quebec, sent Butler to Fort Niagara with instructions to keep the Iroquois neutral. His son, Walter, enlisted as an ensign in the 8th Regiment of Foot, but his wife and other children were detained by the American rebels.

In March 1776, John Butler sent a party of about 100 allied warriors to Montreal to force the Americans out of Quebec. In May 1777, he received instructions to bring as many Iroquois warriors as he could to Fort Oswego for an attack on Fort Stanwix as a part of the Saratoga Campaign. Butler persuaded about 350 Seneca and Cayuga warriors to participate, and was appointed second-in-command of the Indigenous forces under Daniel Claus.

Butler successfully coordinated the ambush of rebel militia and Oneida warriors at the Battle of Oriskany. As a result he was commissioned a Major and given authority to raise his own regiment, which became known as Butler's Rangers, initially with a strength of eight companies. He returned to Fort Niagara, and completed recruiting the first company in December.

In July 1778, Butler led his Rangers and Indigenous allies at the Battle of Wyoming, in which he defeated Lieutenant-Colonel Zebulon Butler's militia and Continentals and captured Forty Fort. Later, the battle was referred to as the "Wyoming Massacre" because of the many Patriots who were killed and scalped as they fled the battlefield. In the days following the battle, homes, barns and mills in the area were looted and burned, however, the inhabitants were not harmed.

Butler commanded his Rangers from his headquarters at Fort Niagara. In 1779, he was defeated at the Battle of Newtown, the only major engagement of the Sullivan Expedition against the Iroquois. He was promoted from major to lieutenant colonel in the winter of 1780.

In 1780, Butler commanded the four companies of Rangers that participated in the large-scale raid on the Schoharie and Mohawk valleys. The raid culminated in the inconclusive Battle of Klock's Field on October 19, 1780. Later in the war, the Rangers were active from Niagara to Illinois County, Virginia.

== Post-war years and death ==
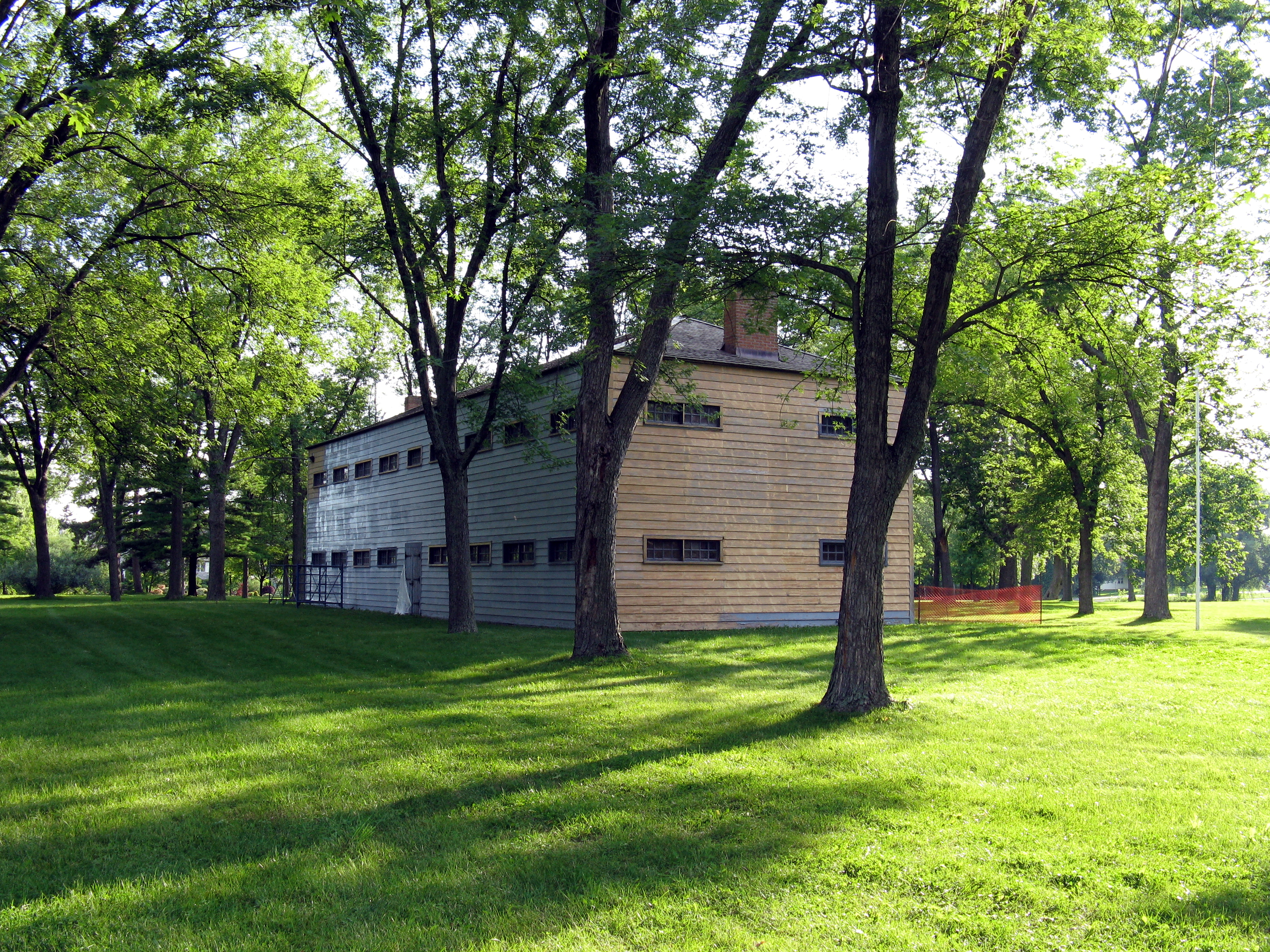
Butler's Barracks in Niagara-on-the-Lake

At the end of the Revolution, John Butler was given a land grant in the Niagara region by the Crown for his services during the war and as compensation for his property in New York having been confiscated. He developed it for agriculture. He became one of the political leaders of Upper Canada, later called Ontario. He was appointed as a Deputy Superintendent for the Indian Department, a Justice of the Peace, and the local militia commander. He was also prominent in establishing the Anglican Church and Masonic Order in what is now Ontario. Butler worked with his superior in the Indian Department, Sir John Johnson, 2nd Baronet, in negotiating the acquisition (Johnson-Butler Purchase or Gunshot Treaty of 1787–1788) of lands east of the Toronto Purchase of 1787.

Butler died at his home at age 68 in Niagara, Upper Canada (now Niagara-on-the-Lake, Ontario) on May 12, 1796. His wife had died three years previously. Butler was survived by three sons and a daughter. John Butler is interred in the family burial ground in Niagara-on-the-Lake.

== Legacy ==
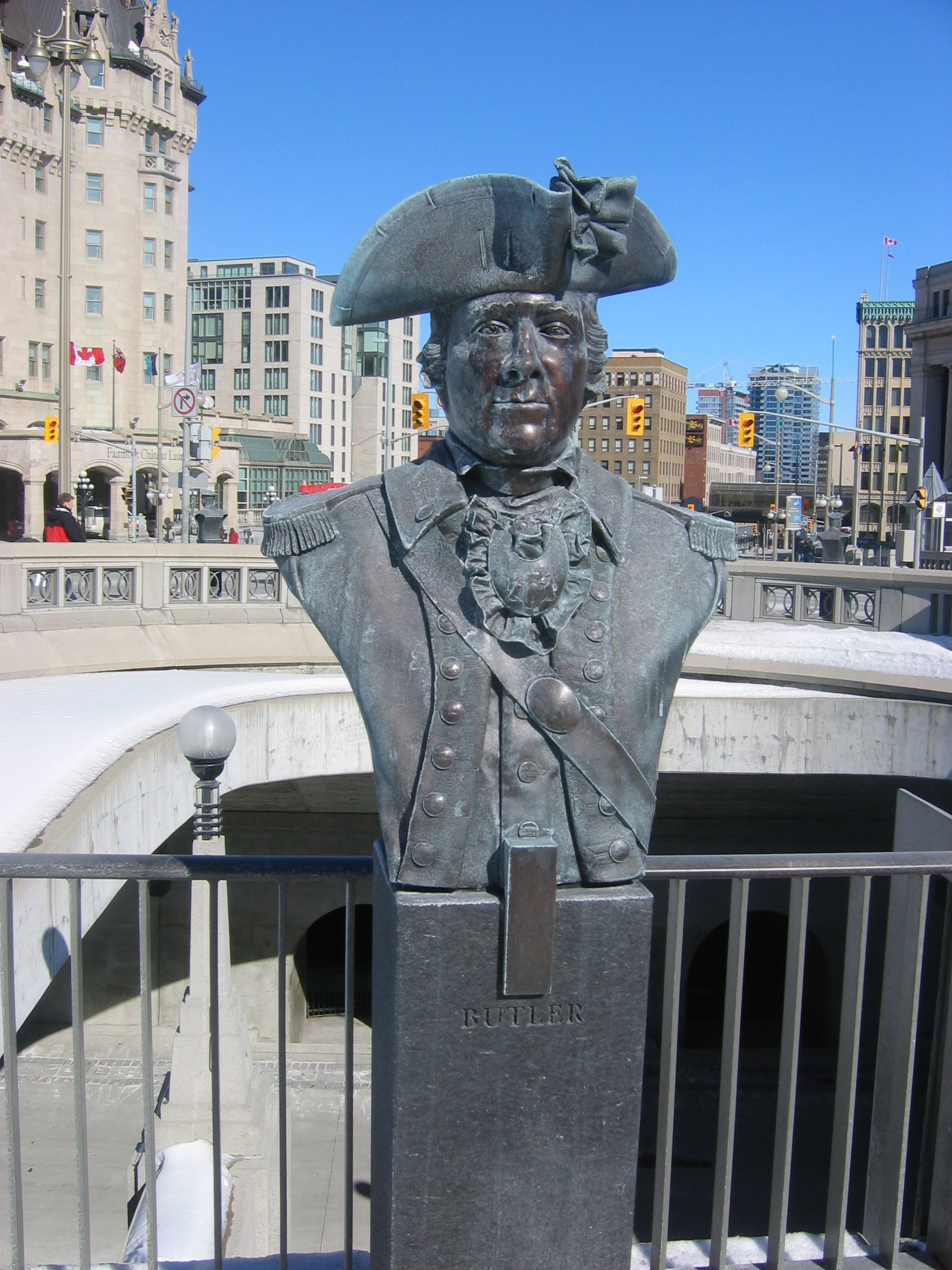
Bust of John Butler, at the Valiants Memorial, in Ottawa

- Col. John Butler School in Niagara-on-the-Lake was named after him, as are numerous other public and private establishments, including a Best Western Hotel, a sports bar, a street leading to the family burial ground on land that was his former property, and the Butler's Barracks established after the War of 1812. The latter has been designated as a National Historic Site.
- In 2006, a life-sized bronze bust of Butler was installed at the Valiants Memorial in Ottawa. Alongside Mohawk leader Joseph Brant, he is considered a key player in the founding of British North America and late eighteenth-century Canada.
- In 2010, a bust was installed on top of a memorial cairn at the site of his homestead on Balmoral Drive in Niagara-on-the-Lake, Ontario.
