= Butler's Barracks =

Historic building in Ontario, Canada

Coordinates: 43.248370°N 79.074044°W

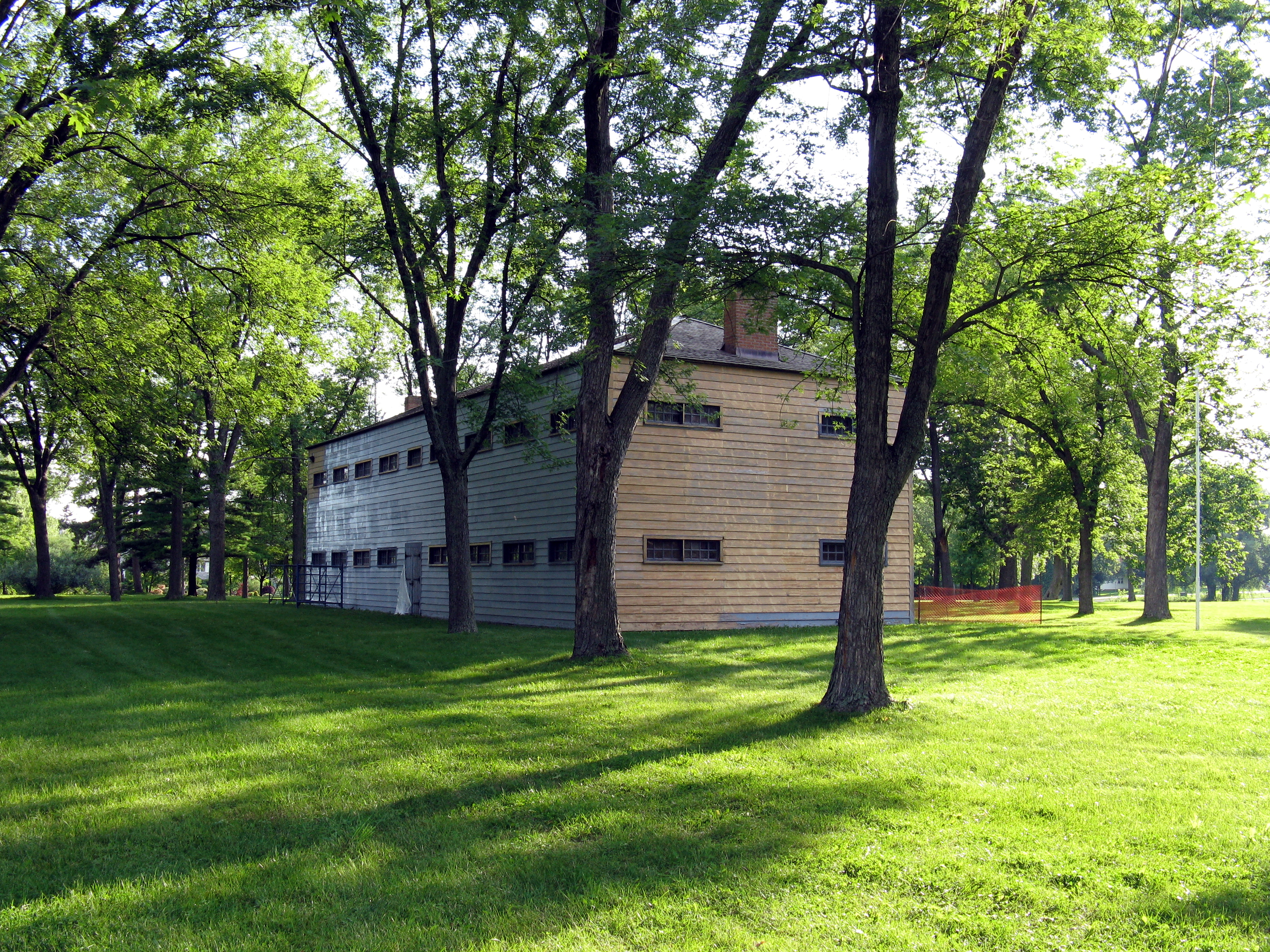
- Butler's Barracks
- Interactive map of Butler's Barracks
- Location: Ontario, Canada

History
- Built: 1778
- Original use: Home of Loyalist military officer John Butler

Site notes
- Governing body: Parks Canada
- Website: Butler's Barracks

National Historic Site of Canada

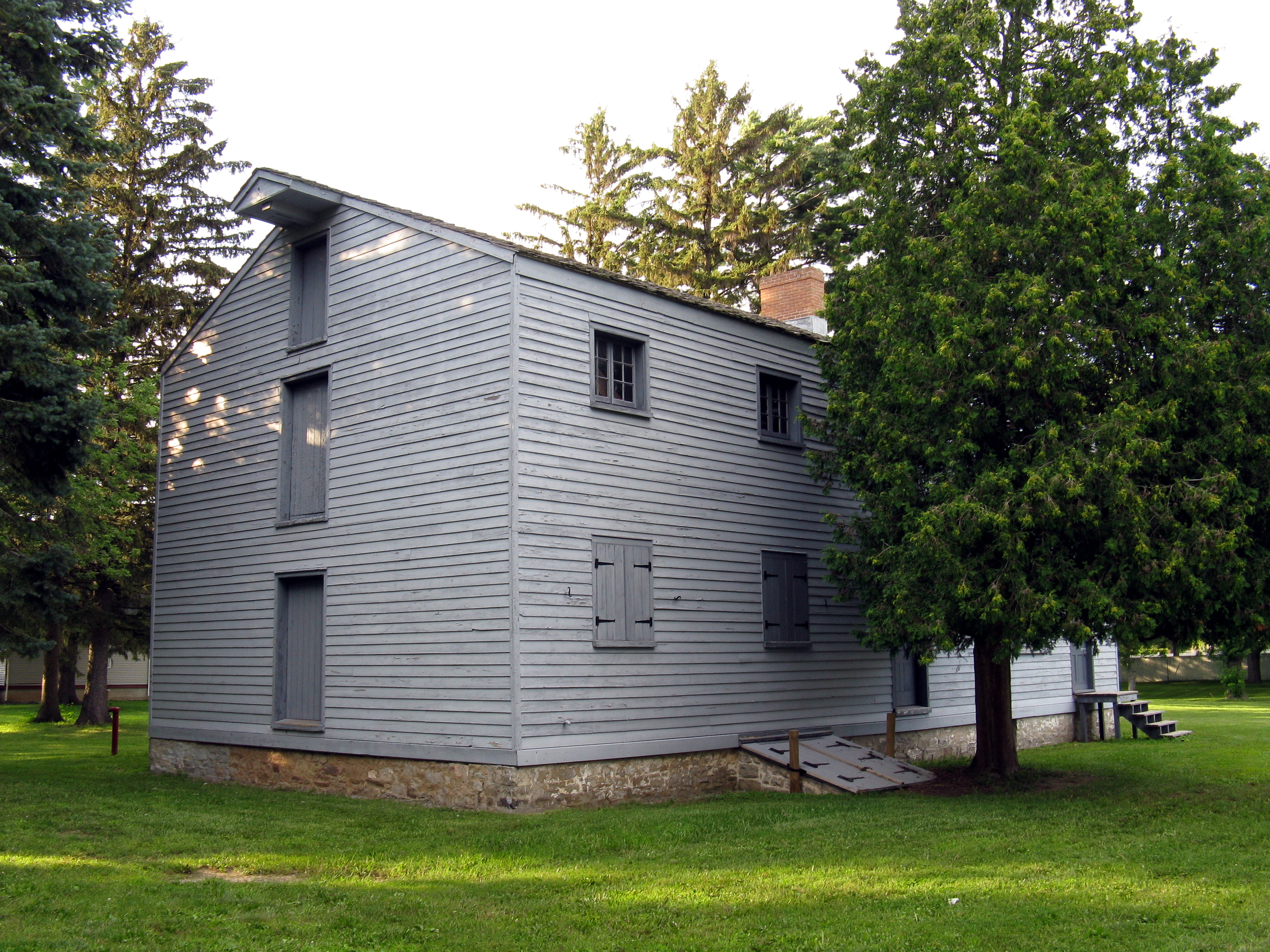

Butler's Barracks was the home of Loyalist military officer John Butler (1728–1796), in what was then Newark, Upper Canada; present day Niagara-on-the-Lake, Ontario. Butler is most famous for leading an irregular military unit known as Butler's Rangers on the northern frontier during the American Revolutionary War.

== History ==
The original barracks were constructed in 1778 on the banks of the Niagara River, and were torn down during the construction of Fort George in 1800.

The building currently referred to as Butler's Barracks was constructed in 1818, and the site at one time was quite extensive, being first used by the Indian Department, and later by the British military. It is one of several military sites in the town along the Niagara River:

- Fort George, Ontario
- Navy Hall
- Fort Mississauga

The barracks was one of several buildings in the Commons area of the town:

- Commissariat Officer's Quarters and Store (1839) - a 2 1/2-storey house home to the British Commissariat Department
- Junior Commissariat Officer's Quarters (1817) - used as Headquarters Staff, a mess or dining facility for officers, and a residence
- Commandant's Quarters
- Indian Council House (1812?) - became Hospital in 1822
- fuel yard
- storehouses
- Gunshed (1821)

The British passed control of the grounds to the Canadian Army in 1871 and they became the training grounds and home to the 2nd Division of the Canadian Expeditionary Force.

From October 1917 to March 1919, the Polish Army trained at Niagara Camp in an area known as Camp Kosciuszko. These men later fought alongside the French Forces in Haller's Army, also known as the Blue Army. The barracks constructed at Camp Kosciuszko were used until the 1960s. It is now part of the Fort George National Historic Site.

== The Lincoln and Welland Regimental Museum ==
The Lincoln and Welland Regimental Museum is located in Butler's Barracks. Exhibits include displays and artifacts from the 18th through the present, and include uniforms, weapons, medals, photographs, regimental band instruments, and other memorabilia.

== See also ==
- Navy Hall
- Fort Niagara
- Fort George, Ontario
- Fort Mississauga

== Bibliography ==
- P.Valasek, Haller's Polish Army in France Chicago 2006
