= Navy Hall =

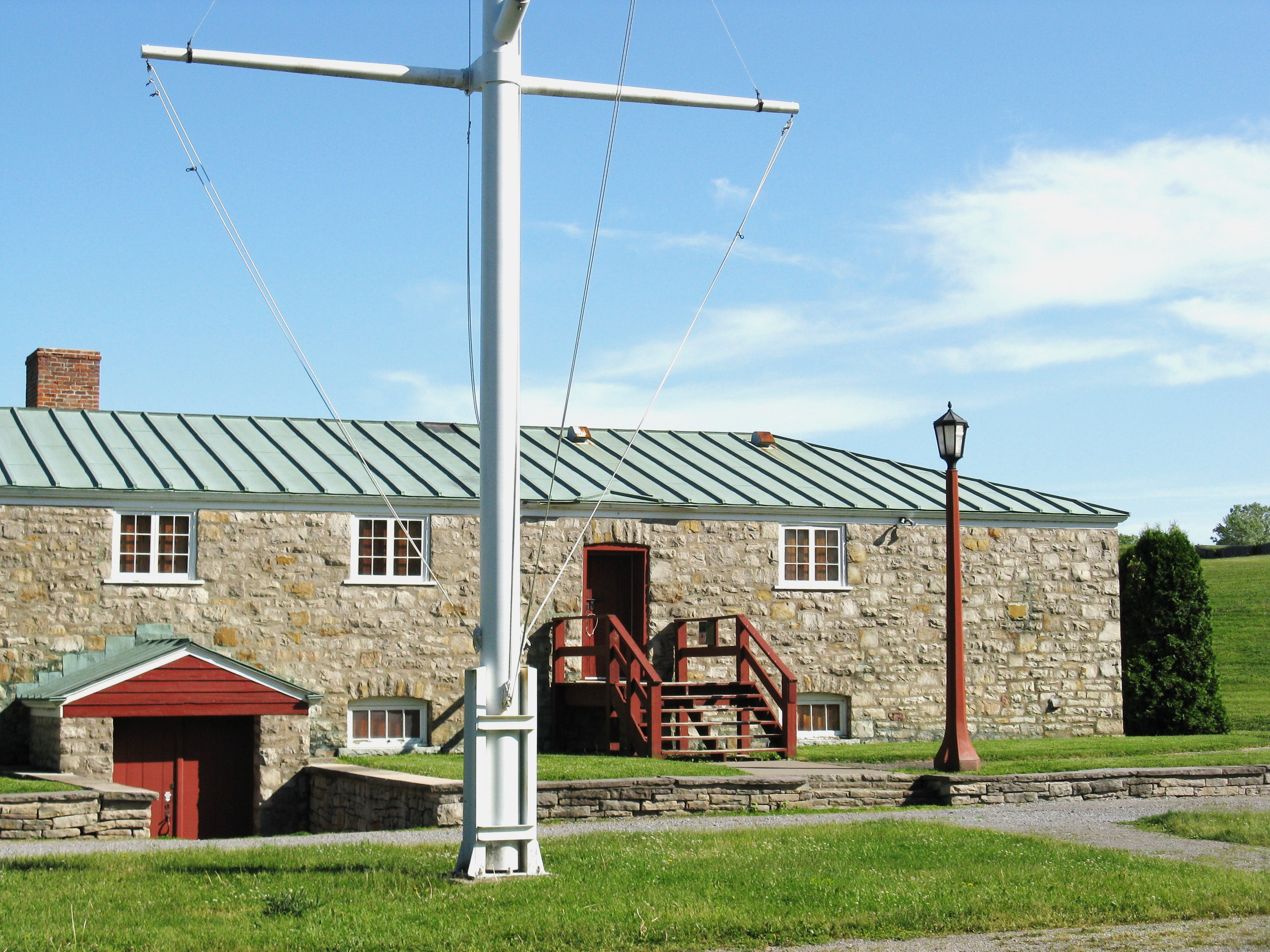
- Navy Hall's stone walls encase the original wood building
- Interactive map of Navy Hall
- 43.252000°N 79.059134°W
- Location: Fort George, Ontario, Canada

History
- Built: 1765 (original); 1815 (rebuilt/current)
- Original use: Naval establishment

Site notes
- Governing body: Parks Canada

National Historic Site of Canada

Navy Hall is a wooden structure encased within a stone structure that was the site of the first provincial parliament of Upper Canada (modern-day Ontario) from 1792 to 1796. It is a unit of Fort George National Historic Site located in Niagara-on-the-Lake, Ontario, then known as Newark, Upper Canada. It sits on Ricardo Street near the shore of the Niagara River, near Fort George, and across the river from Fort Niagara.

== History ==
The original Navy Hall was built as naval establishment in 1765 by Royal Naval Commanders. It consisted of a small shipyard, docks, stores and residences, and was a local supply depot, as well as a trans-shipment point for posts on the upper Great Lakes. During the American Revolution, the Provincial Marine wintered at this complex. In 1792, John Graves Simcoe, the first Lieutenant-Governor of Upper Canada, converted one of the buildings into his residence and office.

In 1792, the first parliament in Upper Canada met in a tent near this site. The first session to sit in Navy Hall was on September 17, 1792. The next year, Simcoe decided to move the capital to York, Upper Canada (now Toronto), a site less vulnerable to attack from the United States. While the first purpose-built Parliament Buildings were being constructed there, Newark continued to serve as the seat of government until 1796. After Parliament left, the building was used as a dining hall by officers from nearby Fort George. Destroyed by U.S. artillery fire in the War of 1812, some of the fort's buildings were re-built by the British, and today's Navy Hall is the only one remaining of that reconstruction.

Simcoe Memorial on the grounds of Navy Hall

An Ontario historical plaque tells of Upper Canada's first Parliament in Newark (Niagara-on-the-Lake)

Originally a wooden storehouse, it was built shortly after the War of 1812, and became a barracks for British troops in 1838, during the Rebellion of 1837–38. It served as a medical commissary during World War I for Canadian troops at what became Camp Niagara, a site preparing soldiers for overseas service. During the 1930s, it was moved to its present site by the Niagara Parks Commission and encased in stone.

== Present Day ==
The current building is managed by Parks Canada as part of Fort George, one of several national historic sites in the region which fall under the administrative umbrella 'Niagara National Historic Sites'. Navy Hall is rented for private functions, but generally closed to the public due to staffing shortages. It houses artifacts from its more than 200 years of history. Located across the street from Fort George, it invites visitors to read outdoor interpretive displays, view the Simcoe Memorial monument, and enjoy the tranquility of its parkland views of the Niagara River and Fort Niagara in New York. Parking is available at the site, convenient for visitors or those embarking on a steamboat excursion, which departs from a nearby dock.

== See also ==
- Fort Mississauga
- Fort Niagara
- Fort Schlosser
