= Fort George, Ontario =

Fort George
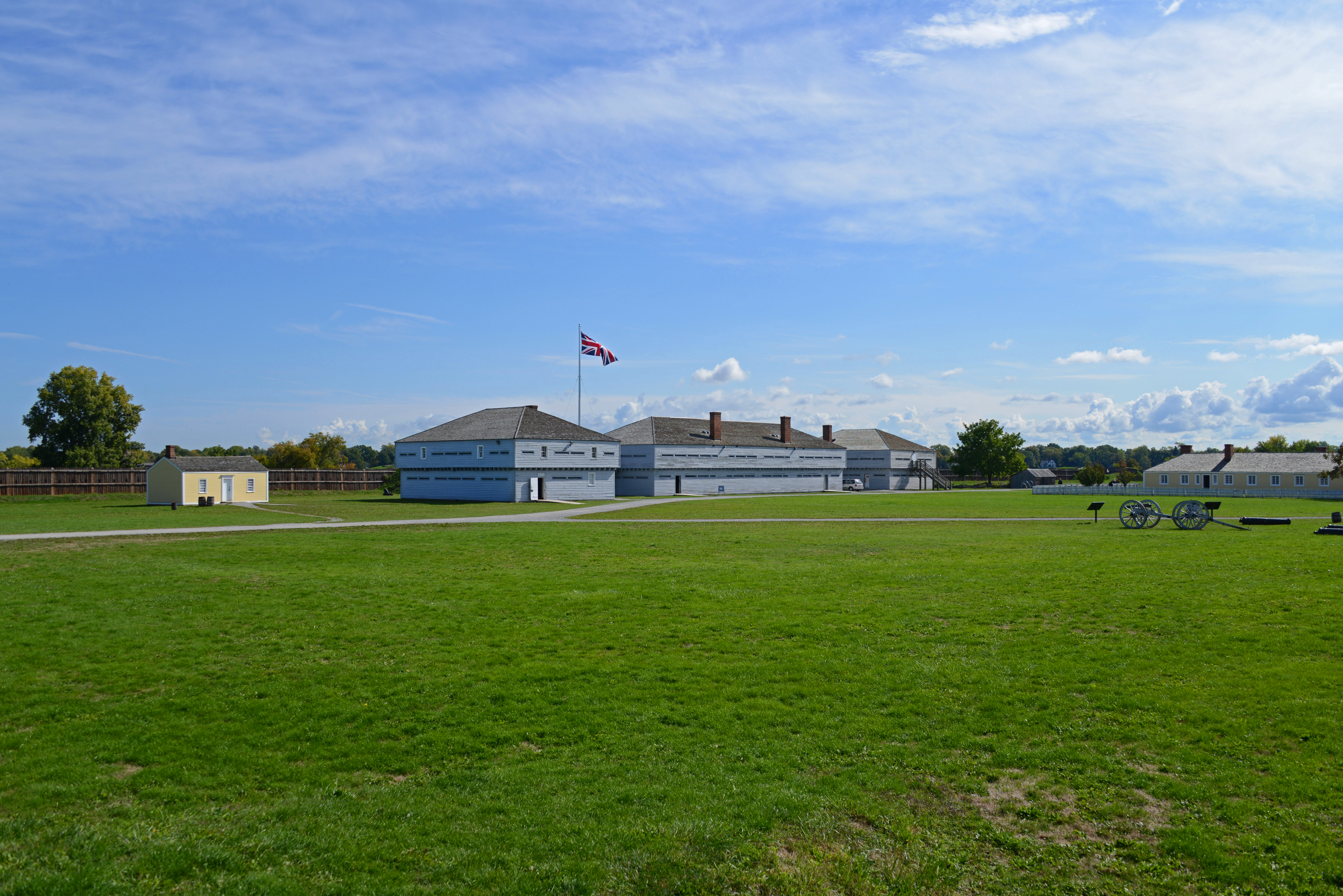
- Blockhouses inside the fort

- Location within Southern Ontario
- 43°15′03″N 79°03′40″W
- Location: 51 Queen's Parade, Niagara-on-the-Lake, Ontario, Canada

History
- Built: 1796–1799
- Original use: Military fortification
- Rebuilt: 1937–1939 (Note: The entire fort was rebuilt from 1937 to 1939, excluding the stone gunpowder magazine, a building that dates back to the original fort.)

Site notes
- Restored by: Niagara Parks Commission
- Current use: Museum
- Owner: Parks Canada
- Visitors: 73,000 (in 2018)
- Website: www.pc.gc.ca/en/lhn-nhs/on/fortgeorge

National Historic Site of Canada
- Official name: Fort George National Historic Site of Canada
- Designated: 21 May 1921

Fort George was a military fortification in Niagara-on-the-Lake, Ontario, Canada. The fort was used by the British Army, the Canadian militia, and the United States Army for a brief period. The fort was mostly destroyed during the War of 1812. The site of the fort has been a National Historic Site of Canada since 1921, and features a reconstruction of Fort George.

The British established Fort George in the 1790s to replace Fort Niagara. Many of its structures were demolished in May 1813, during the Battle of Fort George. After the battle, American forces occupied the fort for seven months before withdrawing in December 1813. Although the British regained the fort shortly afterwards, little effort was put into its reconstruction after they captured Fort Niagara the following week. The poor wartime design of Fort George led to its replacement by Fort Mississauga in the 1820s, although the grounds of Fort George saw some use by the military until the end of the First World War. During the late-1930s, the Niagara Parks Commission built a reconstruction of Fort George. The site was opened in 1940, and has been managed as a historic site and living museum by Parks Canada since 1969.

The fort has irregular-shaped earthwork with six bastions and a number of reconstructed buildings within it. The restored gunpowder magazine is the only building that dates to the original Fort George. The fort forms a part of Fort George National Historic Site, which also includes Navy Hall to the east of the fort. The historic site serves as a learning resource for the War of 1812, 19th-century military life in Canada, and the historic preservation movement during the 1930s.

== Background ==
A fort was first considered on the site by Gother Mann of the Royal Engineers. The fort was intended to serve as a secondary fort to Fort Niagara, assisting in that fort's defence in the event it was attack. Fort George's large size was due to its original purpose as a supply depot, rather than as a true defensive fortification. The fort neither defended the mouth of the river, nor any approach to the adjacent settlement.

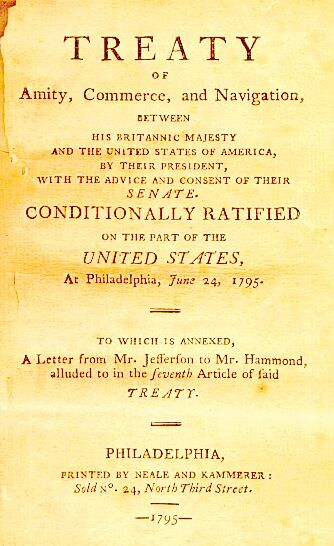
Facsimile of the first page of the Jay Treaty. Fort George was erected as a result of the treaty, which required British forces to withdraw from the American Northwest Territory.

However, after the Jay Treaty was signed, British forces were required to withdraw from U.S. territory, including Fort Niagara. (Note: Although the Treaty of Paris stipulated British forces withdraw form the newly formed United States, British forces did not withdraw from the American Northwest Territory until after Jay Treaty was signed in 1796.) In 1791, land was formally set aside to build new fortifications on the high ground adjacent to the Navy Hall at Niagara-on-the-Lake. The site was selected by members of the Royal Engineers, as its elevation was 4.3 metres (14 ft) higher than the elevation of Fort Niagara.

== History ==
Although the British set aside land near Navy Hall to build a new fort, the British Army did not begin construction of Fort George, or its withdrawal from Fort Niagara until 1796, after the Jay Treaty was signed. Fort George was completed in the same year with a blockhouse/barracks, a stone gunpowder magazine, and two small warehouses. In an attempt to negate this advantage, American forces built a battery on an elevated river bank opposite of Fort George. In an effort to counter the American battery, the British built a half moon battery southeast of Fort George. Fort George was largely manned by members of 2nd Battalion of the Royal Canadian Volunteers (Macdonell’s Battalion) after British forces withdrew a number of soldiers from Upper Canada.

Tensions with First Nations and the U.S. government in the late 1790s prompted British forces to refortify the colony, including the fort itself. Six earthen and log bastions, connected by a wooden 3.7-metre (12 ft) palisade, and surrounded by a ditch were built around the fort; with the fort containing five log blockhouses/barracks, a hospital, kitchens, workshops, and officers' quarters by the start of the 19th century. Timber was obtained from trees felled in the area; and transported via the Niagara River. Most of the fort was built by members of the 2nd Battalion of the Royal Canadian Volunteers, a unit that was later disbanded in 1802.

By 1812, the fort was used as the headquarters for the central division of the British Army and a depot for the Indian Department. Believing Fort George was too large to defend given the number of soldiers he had available, Major-General Isaac Brock drafted plans to reduce the size of the fort by a third. Specifically, he proposed to abandon the southern bastions, the octagonal blockhouse, and the stone gunpowder magazine, while erecting palisades to cut off the abandoned sections from the rest of the fort.

=== War of 1812 ===
Shortly after the American declaration of war, work on the northeast bastion was undertaken by members of the York Militia. When the fort was manned by British during the war, the fort was occupied by British Army regulars; members of the Canadian militia, including the Captain Runchey's Company of Coloured Men; and First Nation allies.

Given the fort's location near the Canada–United States border, the fort became the centre of several military actions during the War of 1812. In October 1812, the fort was subject to bombardment with heated shots from American forces in Fort Niagara, as a diversion for the American assault on Queenston Heights. The diversionary bombardment, in addition to another bombardment in November 1812 led to the destruction of several buildings in the fort. After Brock's death at Queenston Heights, he was buried in a military funeral at Fort George's northeast bastion.

==== Battle of Fort George ====
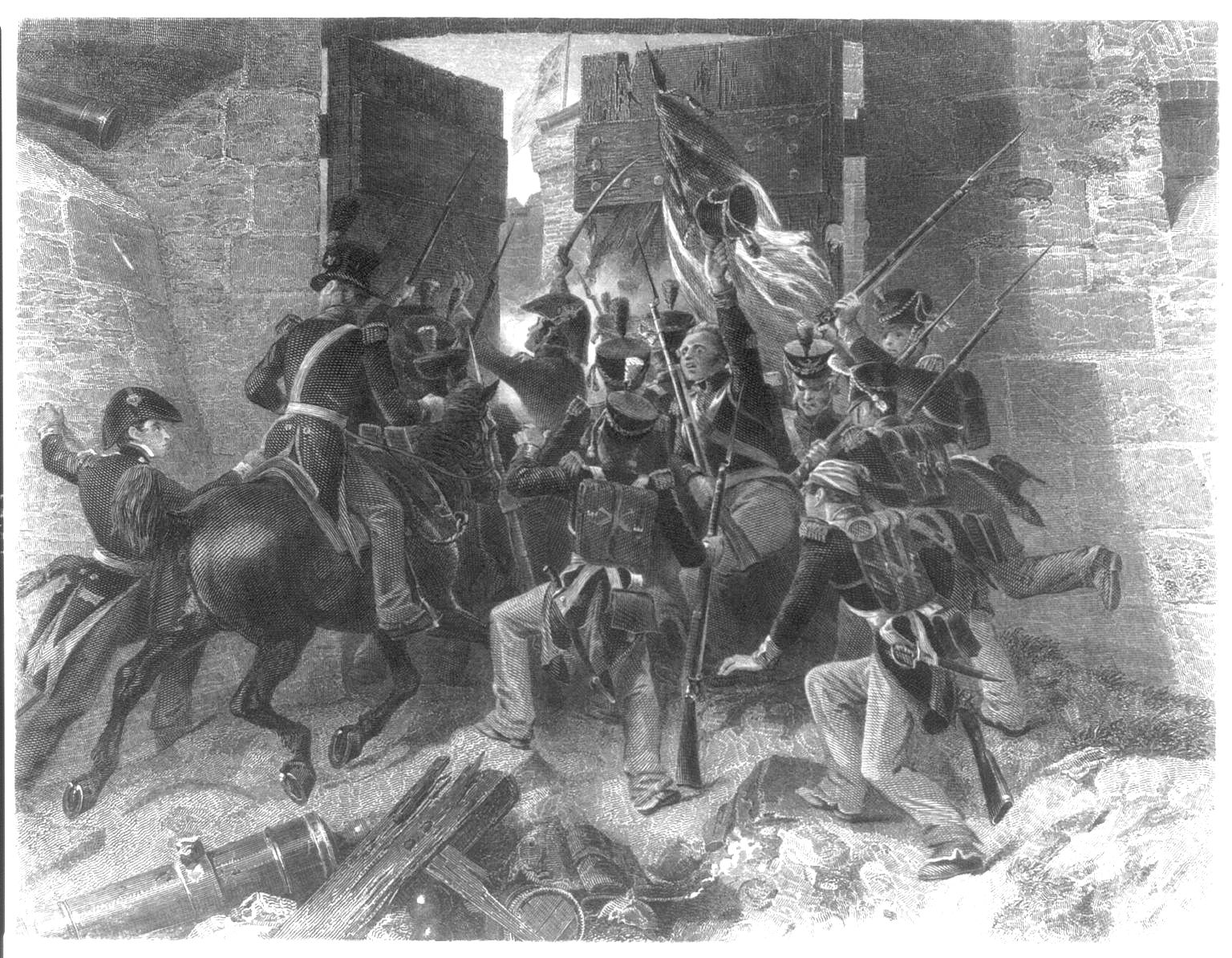
Col. Winfield Scott at the gates of Fort George at the end of the Battle of Fort George, May 1813

The Battle of Fort George began on 25 May 1813, when Fort George was subjected to an artillery barrage and heated shots from Fort Niagara, and newly built and fortified shore batteries, resulting in the destruction of the log buildings within the fort. Two days later, an American landing force of 2,300 troops disembarked in four waves approximately 3 kilometres (1.9 mi) from Fort George, on the shoreline of Lake Ontario under the cover of cannonade fire. By the third landing wave Brigadier General John Vincent realized that his force of 560 men were at risk of being outflanked, and trapped at Fort George; resulting in him giving the order to destroy the fort's ammunition, to spike its guns, and to retreat and evacuate the fort. First Nations warriors under John Norton covered the British retreat, although the Americans made no real effort to pursue them.

The Americans advanced cautiously towards the fort, wanting to avoid any potential casualties against a potentially sabotaged gunpowder magazine; which occurred at the conclusion of the Battle of York. American forces were able to prevent the destruction of a substantial portion of what remained of the fort, having arrived quickly enough for a U.S. artillery captain to extinguish one of the magazine fuses.

==== American occupation ====
Although the British evacuated the fort on 7 June, American forces did not formally occupy the fort until 9 June. Once the Americans occupied the fort, they immediately began work on new fieldworks, refortifying the bastions of the fort, and extending the northwest bastion; with the fort serving as the U.S. Army of the center's headquarters. Although American forces used some parts of the fort's old fieldwork, the fort was made substantially smaller, into a more defensible pentagonal-shape fort. In addition to rebuilding the earthwork ramparts, they also repaired the palisades, and added entrenchments near the northeast bastion and towards the river. However, they did not erect any other permanent structures in the fort, with its forces instead garrisoning in small outlying outposts around the fort.

The fort was largely modified to defend the American encampment adjacent to the fort from an attack from inland. The Americans intended to use the encampment as a staging ground for an invasion further into the Niagara peninsula. During its seven-month occupation of the fort, the American military initially brought more soldiers to the fort in preparation for their advance, and raised a local volunteer corps (Upper Canadian Volunteers), making it the only military unit to be raised within the fort during the war.

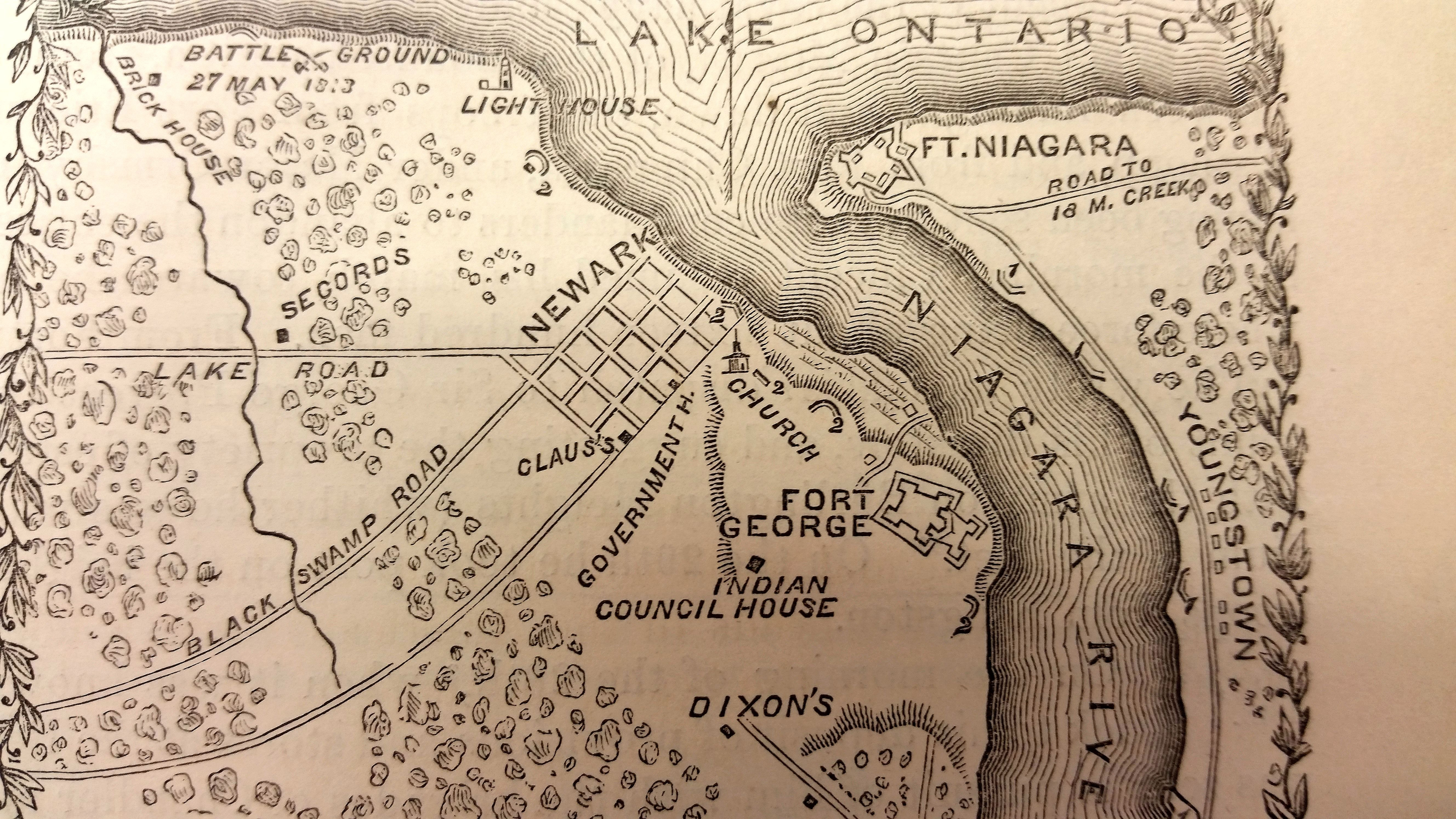
Map of Fort George and the surrounding area during the War of 1812. Fort Niagara and where most of the Battle of Fort George took place are marked on the map to the north. (Note: Niagara-on-the-Lake was known as Niagara from 1798 to the late 19th century. Prior to 1798, the community was known as Newark, and is erroneously labelled as such on some maps from the period.)

Although the fort was intended to act as a bridgehead for an American invasion of the peninsula, the American military was forced to reconsider its invasion plans after facing several setbacks; including disease, increased desertion rates, continued risk of ambush outside the confines of the encampment, and a British advance towards the area after the battles at Stoney Creek, and Beaver Dams. Plans to advance further inland were eventually scrapped, and American forces commenced a slow withdrawal from the fort; with only 60 soldiers remaining in Fort George by December 1813. Upon receiving intelligence that 1,500 British and 700 First Nations warriors were advancing onto the fort, the American garrison was ordered to withdraw, and to raze the fort and the adjacent settlement. The American garrison left the fort on 11 December after spiking the fort's guns and razing the settlement; although they did not destroy what remained of the fort.

==== British reoccupation ====
British forces arrived at the fort shortly after the Americans departure from the town, finding the only remaining buildings in the fort being the gunpowder magazine, and some temporary magazines erected by the Americans. Shortly after reoccupying the fort, the British began working on building a temporary barracks, officers' quarters, guardhouse, and another magazine. Nine days after reoccupying the fort, British forces conducted an assault that led to the capture of Fort Niagara, and the razing of communities on the American side of the river in retaliation for the burning of Niagara. As Fort Niagara remained occupied by the British for the remainder of the war, British military focus shifted towards the more strategically placed Fort Niagara; with no further investments made in maintaining Fort George.

In July 1814, American forces under Winfield Scott attempted to seize forts George and Niagara. However, Scott was forced to withdraw after realizing the naval support he was promised would not materialize.

=== Post-War of 1812 ===
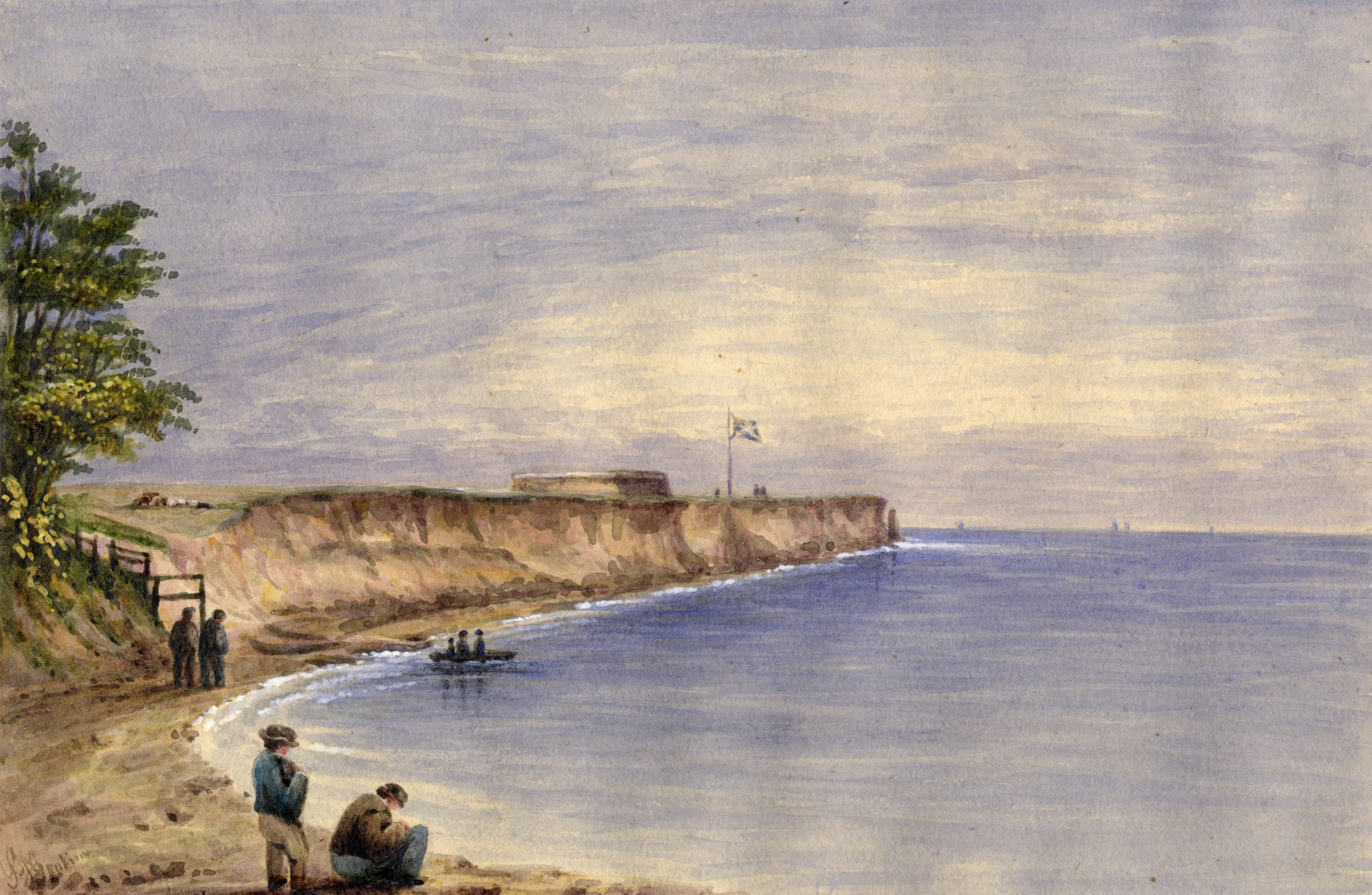
Depiction of Fort Mississauga, c. 1860s. Built in the 1820s, the construction of Fort Mississauga was prompted by inadequacies demonstrated by Fort George during the war.

In 1817, American president James Monroe visited the Canadian side of the Niagara River during a goodwill trip, and was entertained by British officers at the fort. However, Fort George's inability to guard the mouth of the Niagara River was criticized by military analysts after the war, leading to the construction of Fort Mississauga near the mouth of the river in the 1820s. During the same period, work on Butler's Barracks was undertaken southwest of the fort, and out of range of the batteries on the American side of the river.

The equipment within the fort was later auctioned away in 1821, and its palisades relocated to other sites in the next year. By 1825, the body of Isaac Brock was disinterred from the northeast bastion, and placed at Brock's Monument in Queenston. In 1828, the headquarters of British Army centre division was formally moved to York, with the fort reportedly only made up of a few "wooden decaying barracks". In 1839, Navy Hall was converted into a barracks for the British garrison, with the fort's former barracks being converted to a stables.

During the 1860s, the Canadian government took control of the British military complex in the area, which included Fort George, Fort Mississauga, Butler's Barracks, and the training commons; although the ruins of Fort George saw little use from the Canadian militia. The ruins of the fort was intermittently leased to a private citizen, who acted as a custodian-tenant of the property. During this period, several buildings were converted for other uses; with the officers' quarters incorporated into a farmhouse, the stone gunpowder magazine used for storing hay, and the property itself used as a grazing field for cattle. By the 1880s the bastions and the gunpowder magazine were in poor condition, portions of the fort were being used as farmland, with only the officers' quarters occupied by a custodian.

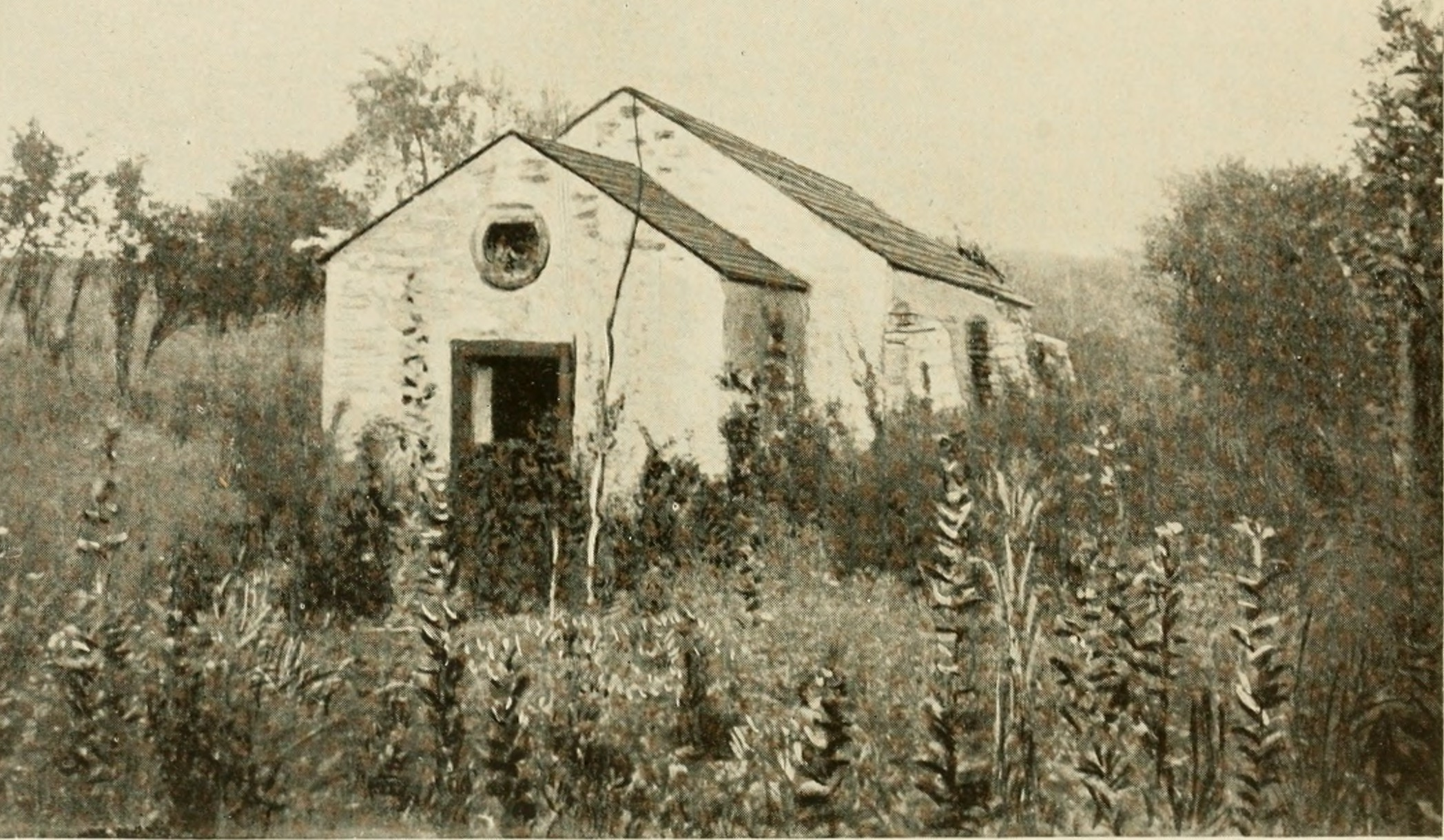
The fort's gunpowder magazine in 1908. By the 20th century, the magazine was the only structure from the original fort still standing.

In 1882, the Wright family was granted a lease from the Department of Militia and Defence; which led to the opening of a golf club in the area, with the golf course occupying portions of the ruins. The golf course was transformed into an eighteen-hole course in 1895, further expanding into the ruins in 1895. The fort's ruins were the subject of controversy when the golf club proposed clearing the ruins of the fort. As the golf club's membership was predominantly made up of American residents summering in the area, the proposal was subject to criticism from local and Toronto-based newspapers that published nationalistic editorials critical of the proposal; describing it as a "desecration of sacred heroic sites as [selling out] to Sabbath-breaking Americans". Facing stiff criticism, the golf club eventually abandoned their plans for the fort ruins. The golf club ceased operations shortly before the First World War.

During the First World War, the Canadian military built a military hospital on the site of the fort's esplanade, with a mess, kitchen, and guardhouse and lands adjacent to the fort; collectively known as Camp Niagara. The buildings remained in use by the military until the end of the war.

=== Conversion into a historic site ===
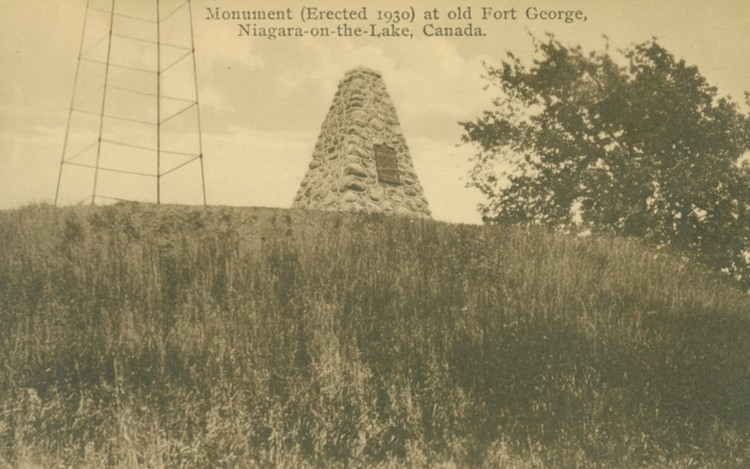
A stone cairn on the site of the fort, c. 1930. A cairn was placed on the site shortly after the site was declared a National Historic Site of Canada.

On 21 May 1921, the site was named as a National Historic Site of Canada, with a stone cairn placed on the site. During the mid-1930s, the Department of National Defence accepted an offer from the Niagara Parks Commission, where the commission would reconstruct and restore Fort George, Fort Mississauga, and the Navy Hall, in return for a 99-year lease on all three properties for C$1 per year; although the department reserved the right to reclaim the properties after providing six-months notice.

The commission began to restore the Navy Hall in August 1937, which was followed by restoration efforts to the fort's gunpowder magazine. However, the fort's officers' quarters were torn down and relocated to another part of the fort; while the buildings erected during the First World War were relocated outside the fort. During this period, bulldozers were also used to push the fort's earthen ramparts into place. The surrounding area was also cleared of overgrowth, resulting from the site's intermittent abandonment. In 1939, reconstruction of the fort's former buildings, in addition to a visitor centre outside of the fort took place. White pine was imported from northern Ontario in order to facilitate the building's construction. The fort reconstruction was completed in 1939 with the installation of its wooden gates, although its visitor centre remained under construction for several months after. Reconstruction and restoration efforts were largely guided by the fort's original 1799 designs; and were largely completed through make-work programs, with the head of the Niagara Parks Commission, Thomas McQuesten, also serving as the provincial Minister of Public Works. Wood used during the reconstruction effort were pressurized with creosote for longevity, with the material lasting until 2010.

Fort George was included in the 1939 royal tour of Canada, although the royal cavalcade only passed by the fort, having never stepped inside it. The Niagara Capital Commission had initially planned a "grand opening" of the site; although the outbreak of the Second World War resulted in these proposals being shelved, deemed "inappropriate" in the midst of a war. Fort George was opened to the public on 1 July 1940; although its "official opening and dedication" did not occur until June 1950, with a flypast provided by the Royal Canadian Air Force, and the United States Air Force. The Niagara Parks Commission operated the fort as a museum, exhibiting military artifacts in the reconstructed blockhouses.

In 1969, the lease with the commission was prematurely ended when the property was transferred from the Department of National Defence to Parks Canada. In 1987, a citizen cooperating association, the Friends of Fort George, was formed. From 2009 to 2010, several archaeological digs were conducted to ascertain the landscape of the fort, as well as excavate artifacts left behind by soldiers during the war.

== Grounds ==
The fort, and its surrounding grounds are operated by Parks Canada as the Fort George National Historic Site of Canada. The national historic site includes the fort, and a visitor reception centre situated outside the fort. West of the fort is the Commons, 80 hectares (200 acres) of green space that separates the Fort George National Historic Site from Butler's Barracks, another National Historic Site of Canada.

The only structure on the historic site that dates back to the original fort is the stone gunpowder magazine, with the majority of the buildings on the site dating back to the fort's reconstruction in the 1930s. All the historic reconstructed structures are considered "level 2 cultural resources," as they provide the fort's "historical character," a learning resource for the development of historical sites through make-work programs during the Great Depression, and illustrate the methods used by historic preservation movement in the 1930s.

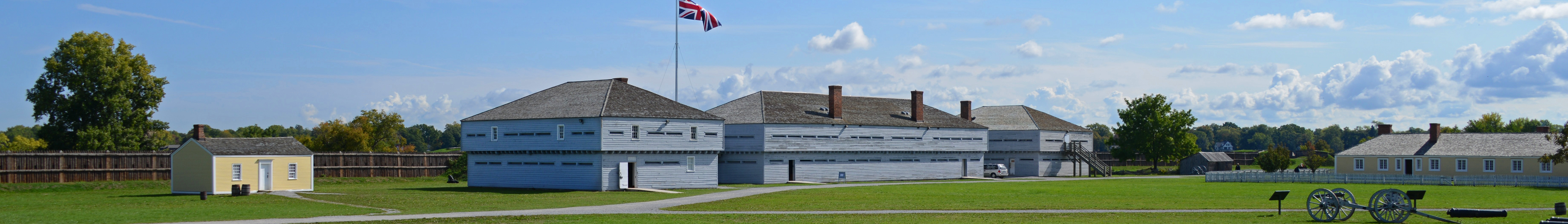
Panorama of the interior of the fort

=== Fort ===
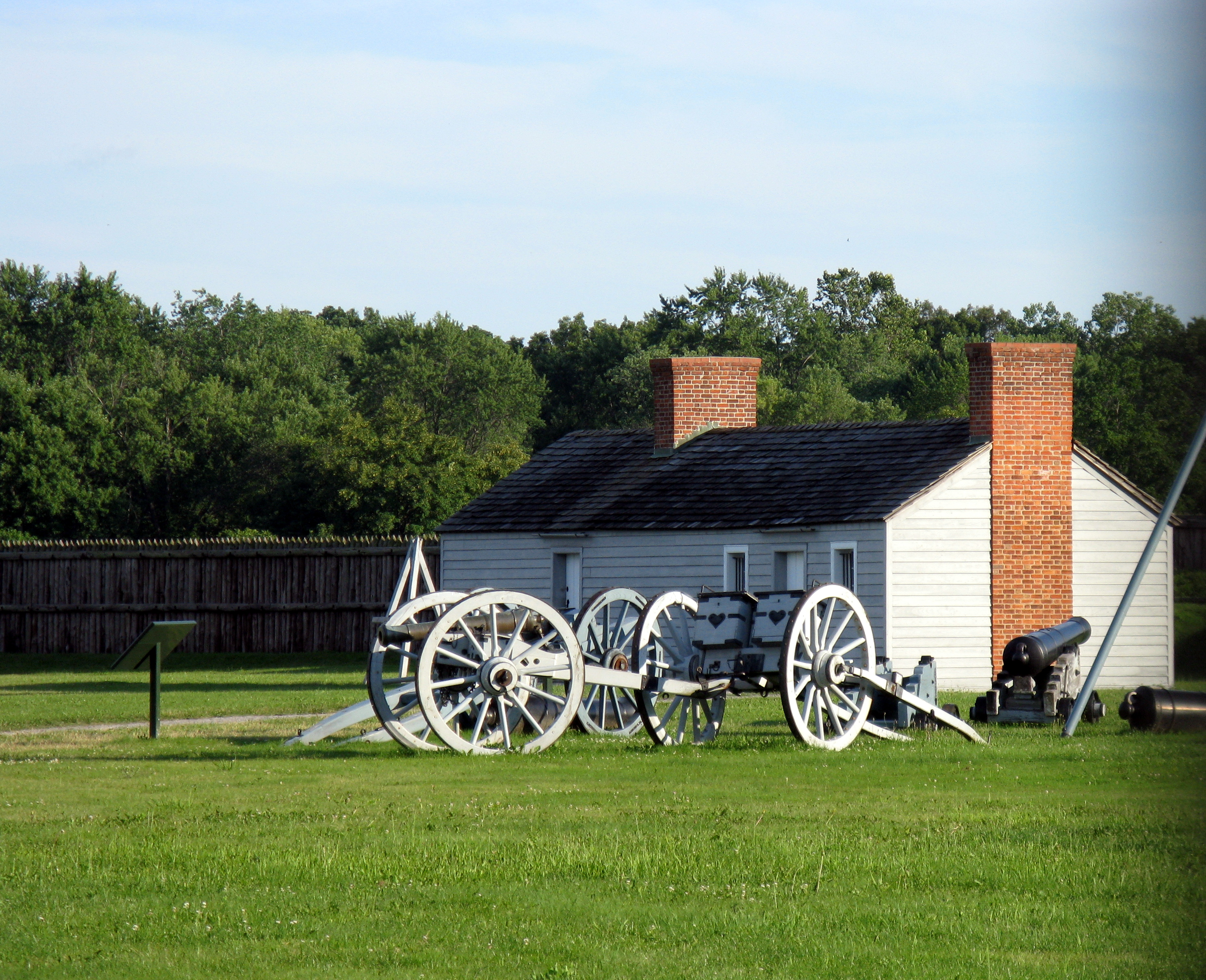
The fort's single-storey guardhouse, rebuilt during the late 1930s.

Although the fort was modified several times in the early 19th century, the 1937–39 reconstruction configured the layout of the fort to resemble its 1799 configurations. However, as a serious archaeological survey was not conducted prior to its reconstruction, several differences exist between the reconstruction and the original 1799 fort; most notably differences with the rampart's placement and a difference in the blockhouses' appearances. Additionally, as the bulldozers were used to reshape the fort's earthworks, the fort's interior terrain was significantly flattened, resulting in a flatter topography when compared to the original fort.

The gunpowder magazine is the only original building in the fort. Reconstructed buildings in the fort include the four blockhouses, a single storey officers' kitchen, a single-storey rectangular officers' quarters built in a Colonial Revival-style, and a rectangular guardhouse with a gabled roof clad in cedar shakes. All the reconstructed buildings are loose interpretation of the original structures, with the designs based on the architect's interpretation of a frontier fort. As a result, the historical designation is confined to the footprint of the buildings. The fort's artificer's and blacksmith shop, was also constructed during the 1930s reconstruction of the fort, although the building itself is not based on any historical antecedent. The building is used as a modern workshop, although it was designed in the same aesthetic as the other reconstructed buildings.

==== Blockhouses ====
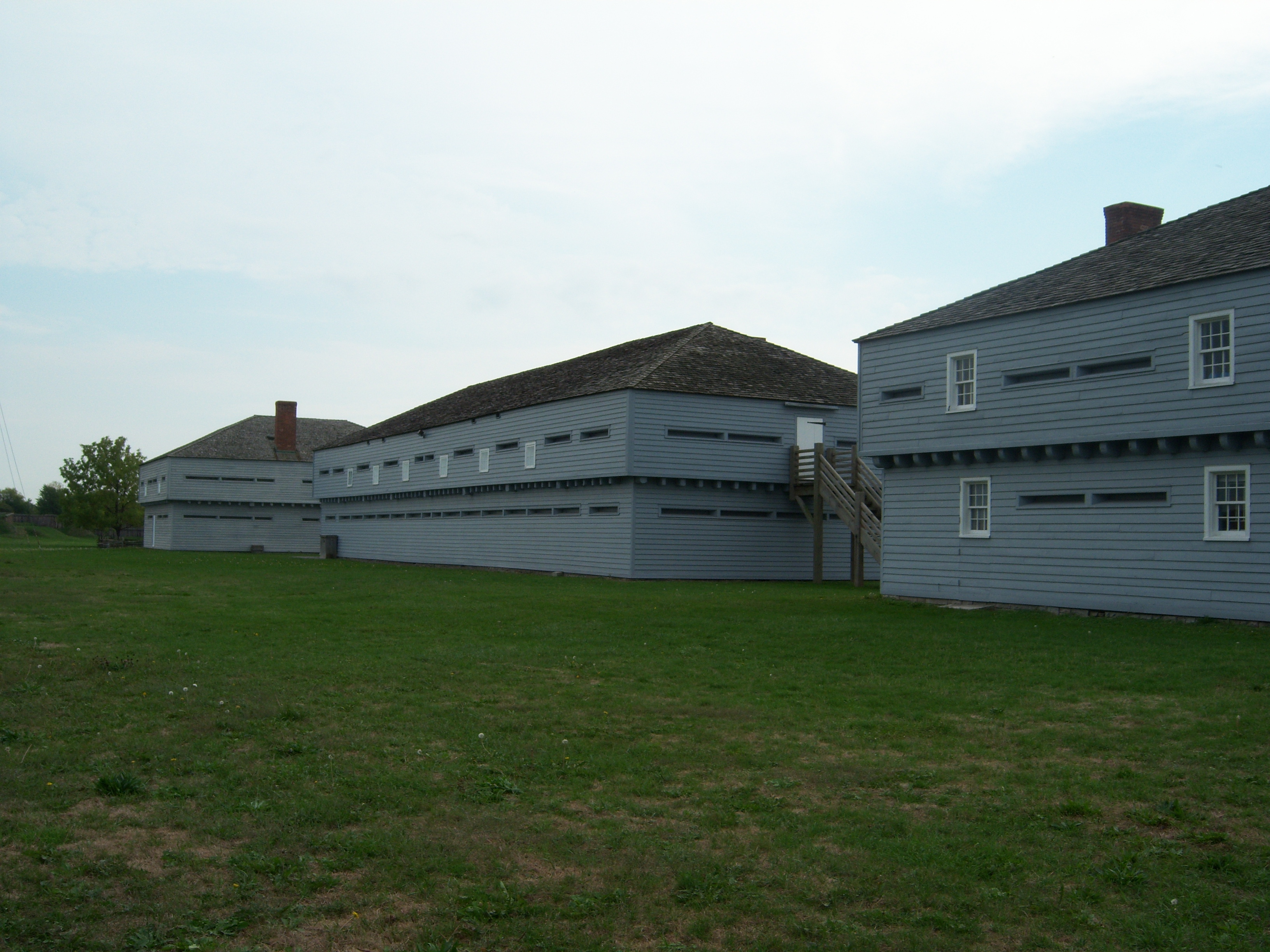
There are three blockhouses inside the fort's palisades

The fort features three blockhouses inside the fort's palisades, all of which were completed in 1939. All three blockhouses are two-storey log structures, whose second storey overhangs from the first. They all also feature a low pitched roof, clad in cedar shakes. However, the present blockhouses found inside the palisades were not designed after the original blockhouses of Fort George, but instead were designed based on existing blockhouses at Fort York.

The blockhouses were designed with an exposed log exterior, based on the architect's interpretation of a rugged "frontier" aesthetic, although clapboards were added onto the blockhouses to give them a more refined appearance. Blockhouse 1 and 3 are square-shaped whereas Blockhouse 2 is a large, rectangular-shaped blockhouse. As opposed to the other blockhouses, Blockhouse 3 is accessed through an exterior staircase that leads to its second storey access point. Blockhouse 3 also houses storage rooms, change rooms, lunch rooms, and washrooms for Parks Canada staff.

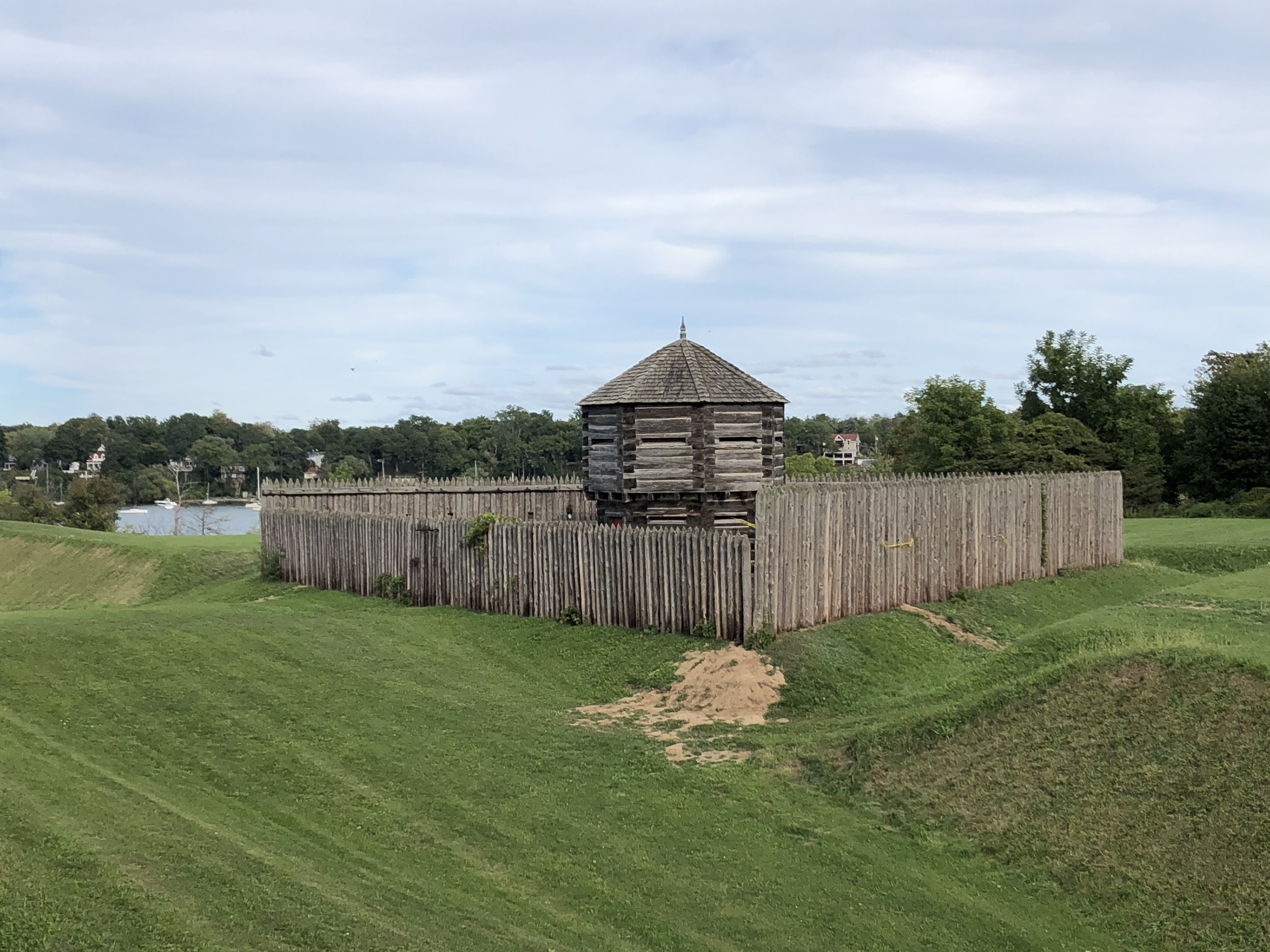
The octagonal blockhouse at the southern redan of the fort's earthworks

In addition to the three blockhouses inside the palisades, there is also another blockhouse located on the palisades of the fort, near the south redan; also completed during the fort's reconstruction. As with the other blockhouses it is two storeys tall and features an overhanging second storey; although unlike the other blockhouses, it takes the shape of an octagon. The only access point to the octagonal blockhouse is through a tunnel from inside the fort. As with the other blockhouses, the aesthetic of the reconstructed octagonal blockhouse was based on the ones from Fort York.

==== Gunpowder magazine ====
The fort's gunpowder magazine is the only structure in the fort that dates back to the fort's original construction in 1796. In addition to being the fort's oldest building, the magazine is also one of Niagara-on-the-Lake's oldest buildings. Although the fort was built on elevated ground above Navy Hall, the gunpowder magazine was built over a depression of a ravine; making the roof the only part of the building visible from Fort Niagara. A drainage system was required to drain the moisture collected from the ravine shortly after the magazine's completion, in order to preventing the floor boards from rotting. Until the fort's gunpowder magazine was completed, the original Navy Hall was briefly used as an ammunition store after the British transferred their garrison from Fort Niagara to Fort George. Shortly after the gunpowder magazine's was completed, defensive earthworks were created to the northeast of the magazine in an effort to further fortify it.

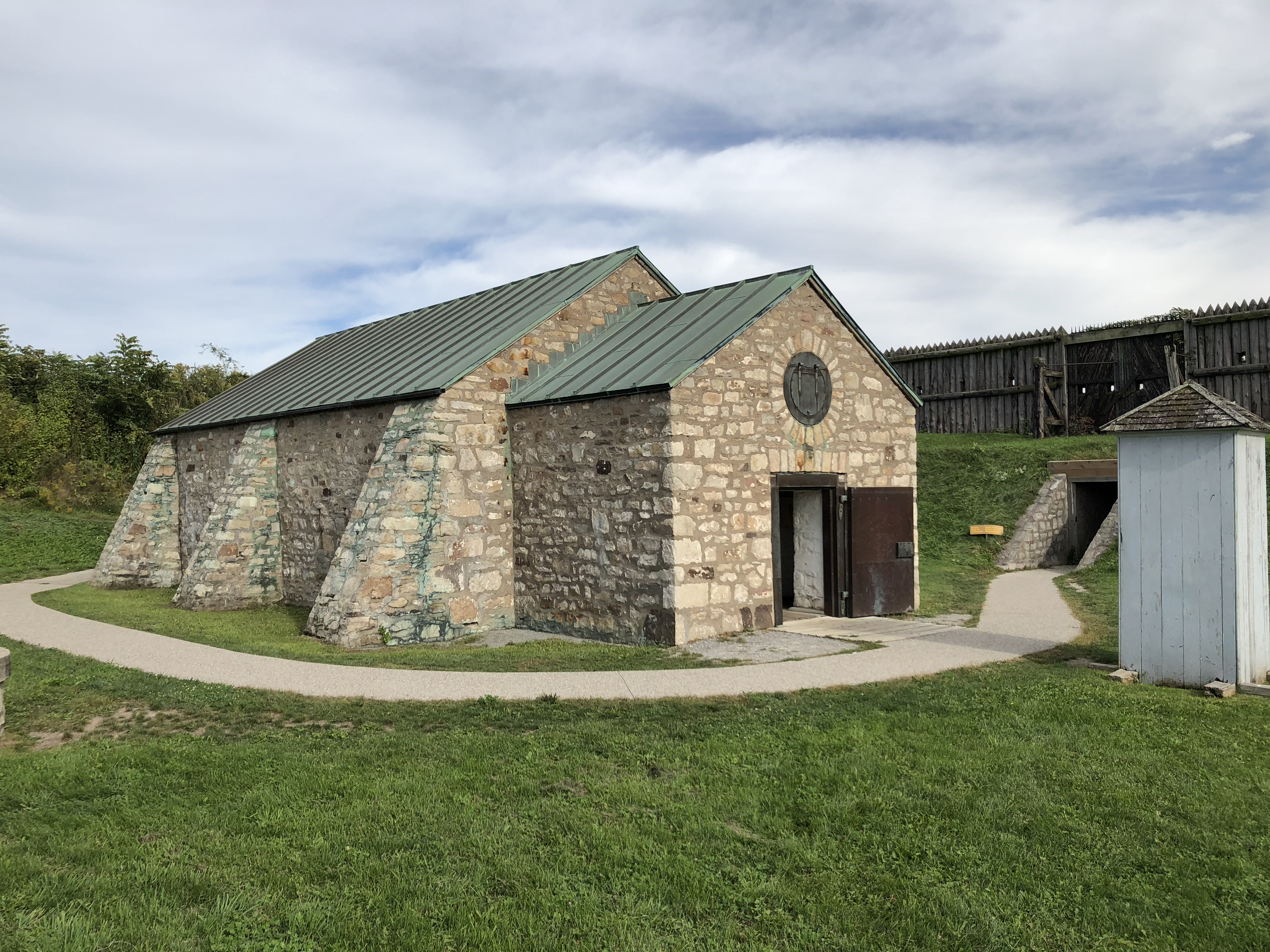
The gunpowder magazine exterior walls are made of 2.4-metre-thick (8 ft) limestone

The walls are made of 2.4-metre-thick (8 ft) limestone likely quarried from nearby Queenston. The interior was built with bricks, with a 0.91-metre-thick (3 ft) brick arch to reinforce its roof. The small windows and doors are sheathed in copper, preventing any accidental ignition of the gunpowder from sparks. The double-layered wooden floors were also pegged to the ground as opposed to nailed. In spite of these features however, the building itself was not shell-proof, and may be liable to fires as a result of accidents or enemy action.

Although the gunpowder magazine was situated in the portion of the fort that was abandoned by Isaac Brock, it remained in use. During the Battle of Queenston Heights, the metal covering on the magazine's roof was set ablaze, although the Garrison quickly removed the metal coverings and extinguished the fire. Although the fort was largely abandoned by the British in the 1820s in favour of Fort Mississauga, the magazine remained in use by Fort Mississauga's garrison until the 1830s. During the mid-19th century, the building was occasionally occupied by squatters.

The building could store 300 barrels of gunpowder, a second stone and brick gunpowder magazine was built, though that magazine was abandoned and reported "in ruins" by 1814.

==== Ramparts ====
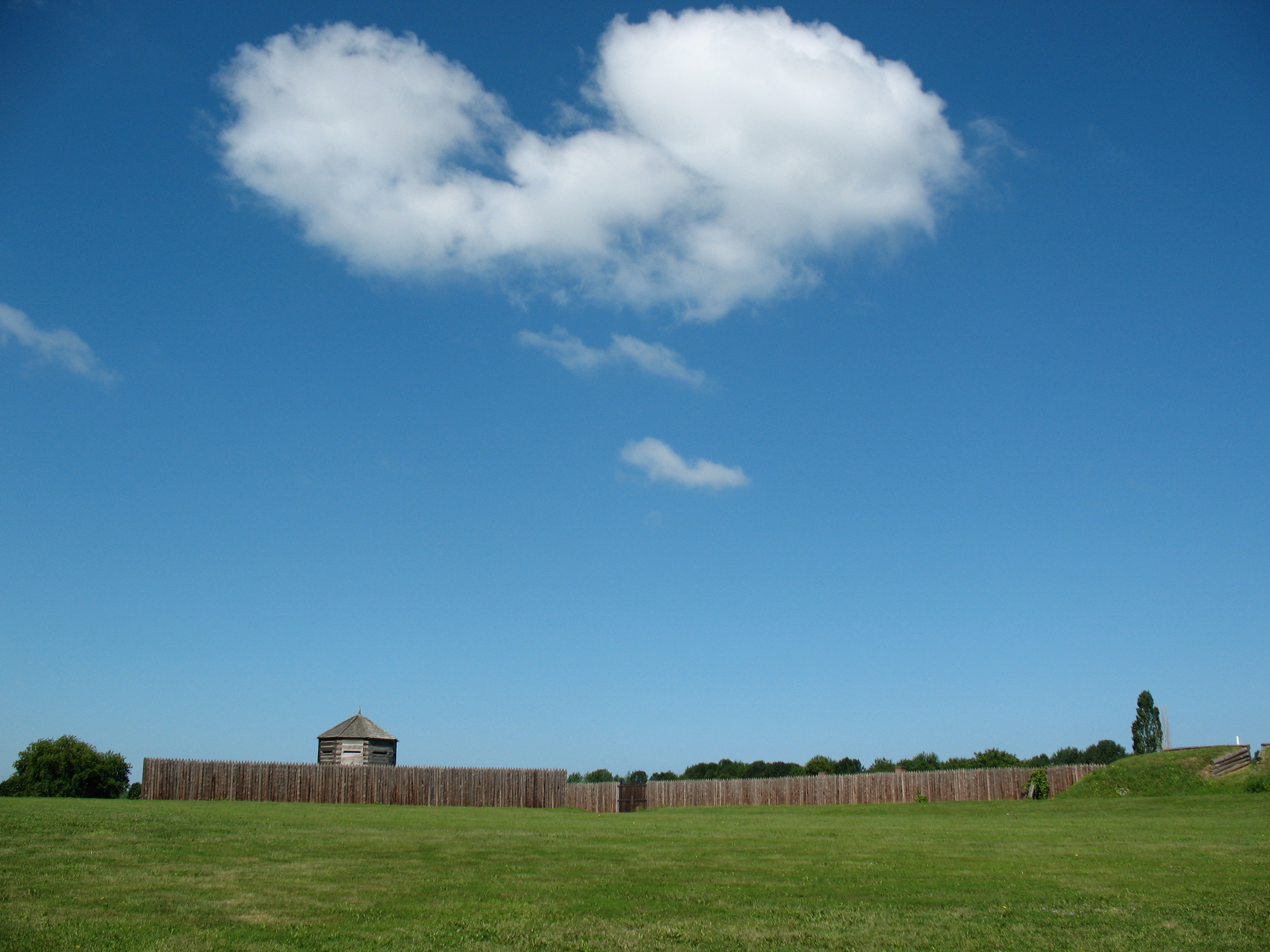
Timber pickets atop the fort's earthworks

The ramparts of the fort were made up of irregular earthworks consisting of six bastions, each framed with timber and connected by a line of picketing. The earthworks were bulldozed into place during the 1930s. As opposed to the present earthworks, which were largely bulldozed in place, the original fort's earthworks were built using wooden cribs over the ravine gully, and using inundated clay to stabilize the soil. Because bulldozers were used for the earthworks reconstruction, only the area around the two northern bastions have a resemblance with the original fort's configuration.

Because the fort was designed as a supply depot and not a true defensive fortification, the earthwork's bastions were poorly positioned, with a lack of interlocking lines of fire creating areas of vulnerability at certain parts of the ramparts. Attempts to rectify these deficiencies were made prior to the War of 1812, when Isaac Brock instructed that the fort's size be reduced, by abandoning the southern ramparts and erecting palisades at the new defensive line. Further modifications made to the fort's original ramparts during the Americans occupation of the fort, transforming it into a smaller, more defensible pentagonal fort. These modifications are not reflected in the reconstructed Fort George, with the restoration process restoring the fort to its 1799 configuration; although the archaeological remains of the American dug entrenchments next to the fort are still visible.

=== Navy Hall ===
In addition to the fort, Fort George National Historic Site also contains Navy Hall, a reconstructed historical building below the eastern ramparts of the fort at the shoreline of the Niagara River. The original Navy Hall predates the construction of the original Fort George, with the building having served as the barracks for the Provincial Marine, and the larger area being used as a shipyard and supply depot for Fort Niagara. During the late 1780s and early 1790s, the building was intermittently used by the lieutenant governor of Upper Canada, John Graves Simcoe as a private residence. Simcoe's offices were made into an officers' mess for soldiers in Fort George; while the rest of the building was used as storage for the Provincial Marines. An American artillery barrage in November 1812 led to the destruction of the original Navy Hall.

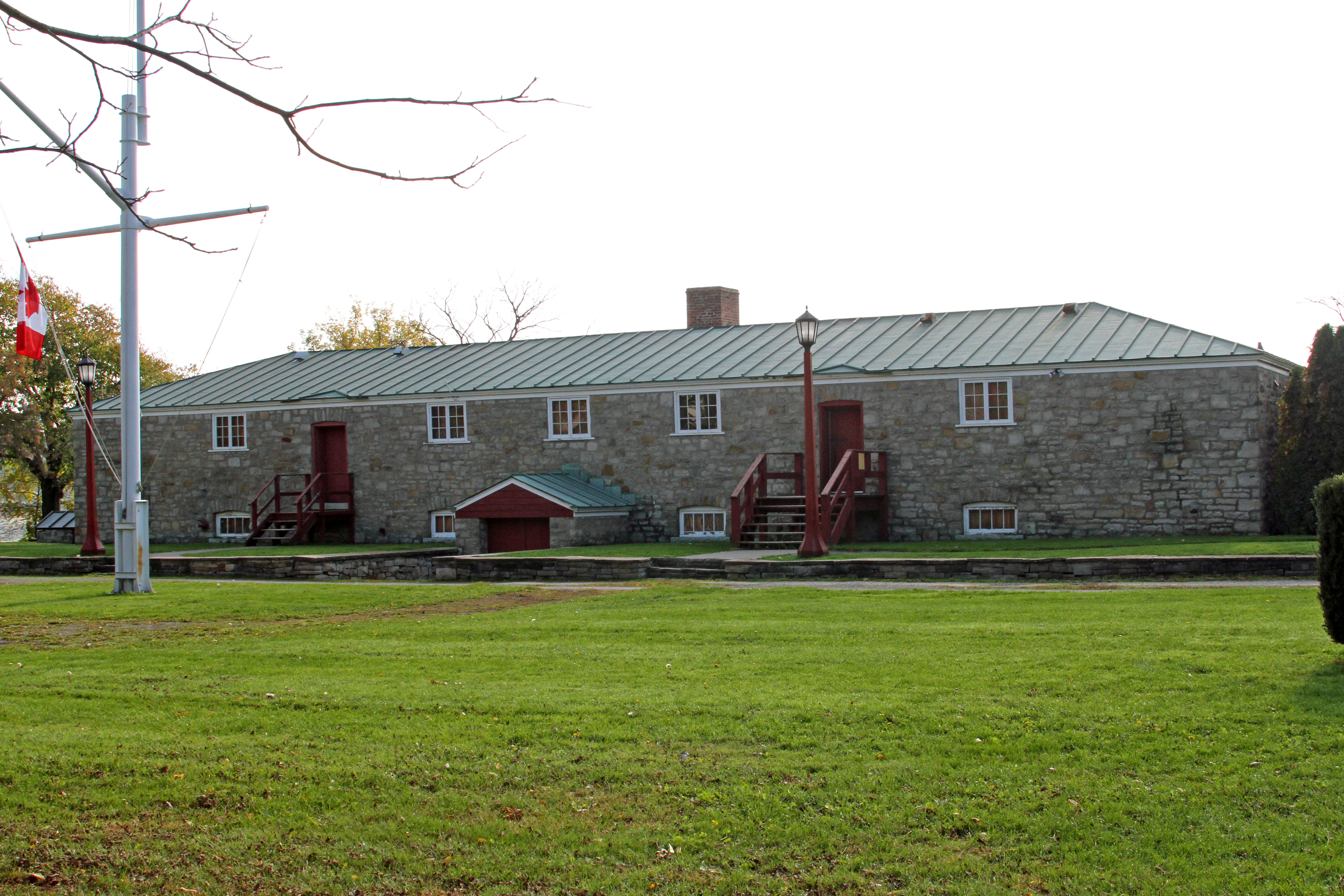
Navy Hall was reconstructed on its original location in 1937

The British rebuilt Navy Hall, and a new wharf shortly after the end of the war; albeit one that was slightly smaller. By 1840, Navy Hall was modified to fit a barracks; and the area surrounded with a guardhouse, customs house, ferry house, and taverns. However, these buildings were relegated to storage use by the 1850s. In an effort accommodate the construction of the Erie and Niagara Railway Navy Hall was moved closer to the fort ruins, and was later converted for use as a stable During the First World War, the building was partially renovated after it was converted into a laboratory for the Canadian Medical Corps. However, it was abandoned again after the war, resulting in its deterioration. After the Erie and Niagara Railway line closed, process of reconstruct the building at its original location was undertaken. A new stone foundation was used, with the building's facade largely encased in stone; while the lumber was salvaged from an old barn.

In 1969, Navy Hall was also designated a National Historic Site of Canada, although it remains associated with the Fort George National Historic Site. As with the other reconstructed buildings in Fort George, Navy Hall's historical designation is restricted to the building's footprint. Like the other reconstructed buildings at the historic site, Navy Hall has not been evaluated by the Historic Sites and Monuments Board of Canada for possible national significance, and is considered a "level 2 cultural resource" for the historic site.

== Museum and tours ==
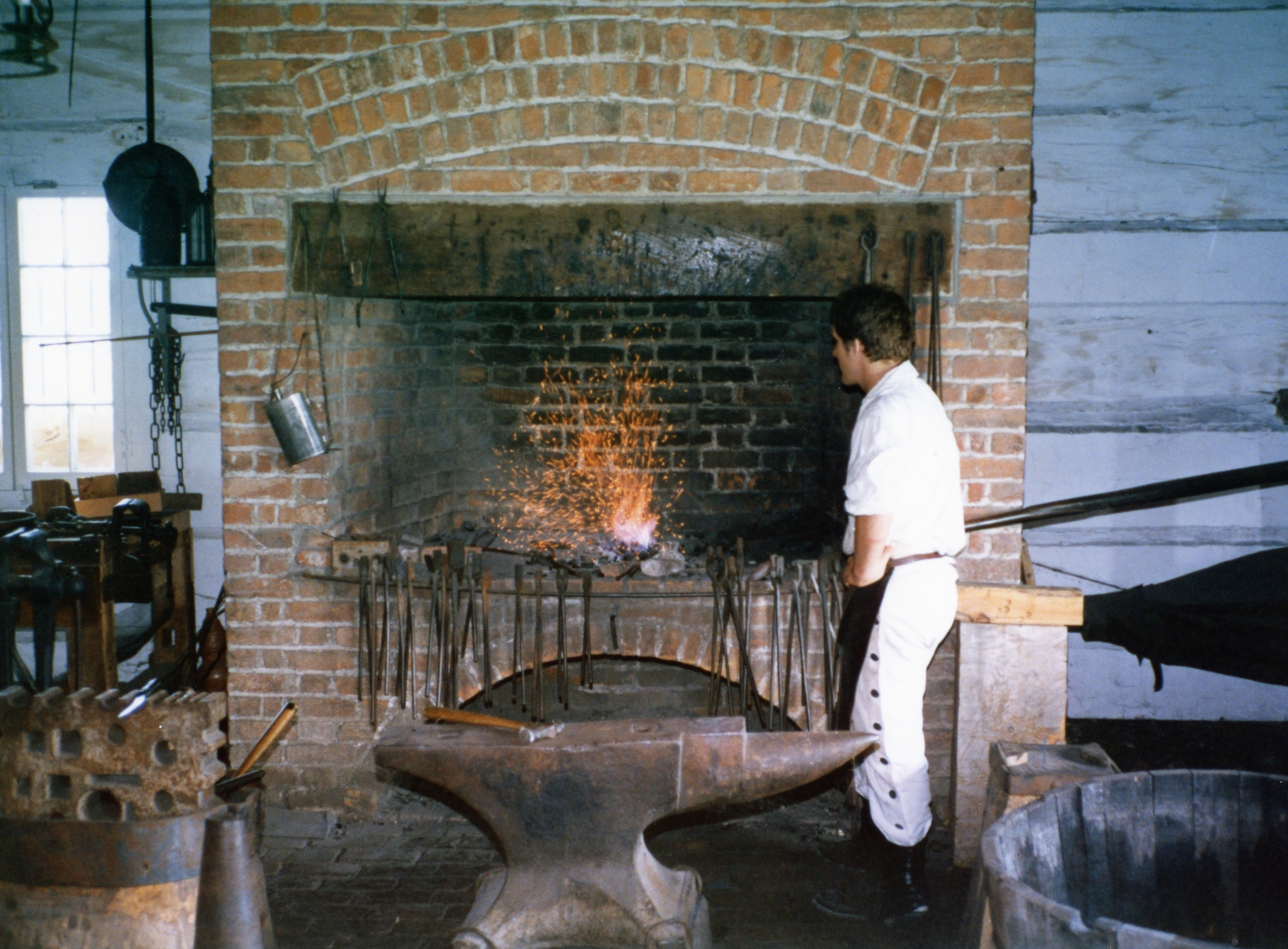
A museum interpreter and reenactor working the fort's blacksmith shop. The fort operates as a living museum.

Parks Canada operates the fort as a living museum providing visitors a glimpse of military life in 19th century Upper Canada, as well as exhibits on the War of 1812. A number of its exhibits focus on lieutenant governor Simcoe, as well as the Provincial Marine, the maritime equivalent of the Canadian militia.

The museum contains several artifacts that originate from the fort during the War of 1812 period, including a portrait of an officer from the 100th Regiment of Foot that was stationed; a sword believed to be carried by an officer of the Royal Engineers, and a sword belt plate from the Lincoln and Welland Militia.

In addition to its historical significance, Fort George is often considered one of the most haunted places in Canada. As a key military post during the War of 1812, Fort George has become the center of hundreds of paranormal reports, ranging from sightings of a benevolent spirit to unexplained noises and ghostly apparitions. The stories of these supposed hauntings are shared through historical ghost tours operated by the Friends of Fort George, a non-profit organization established in 1987. Officially known as the Friends of Niagara National Historic Sites, Inc., the group was formed at the invitation of Parks Canada, with support from local residents eager to take part in preserving and interpreting the site. Through their tours, visitors experience a blend of history and legend that keeps the haunted legacy of Fort George alive.

== See also ==
- List of forts
- List of museums in Ontario
