= Fort Mississauga =

Historic site in Ontario, Canada

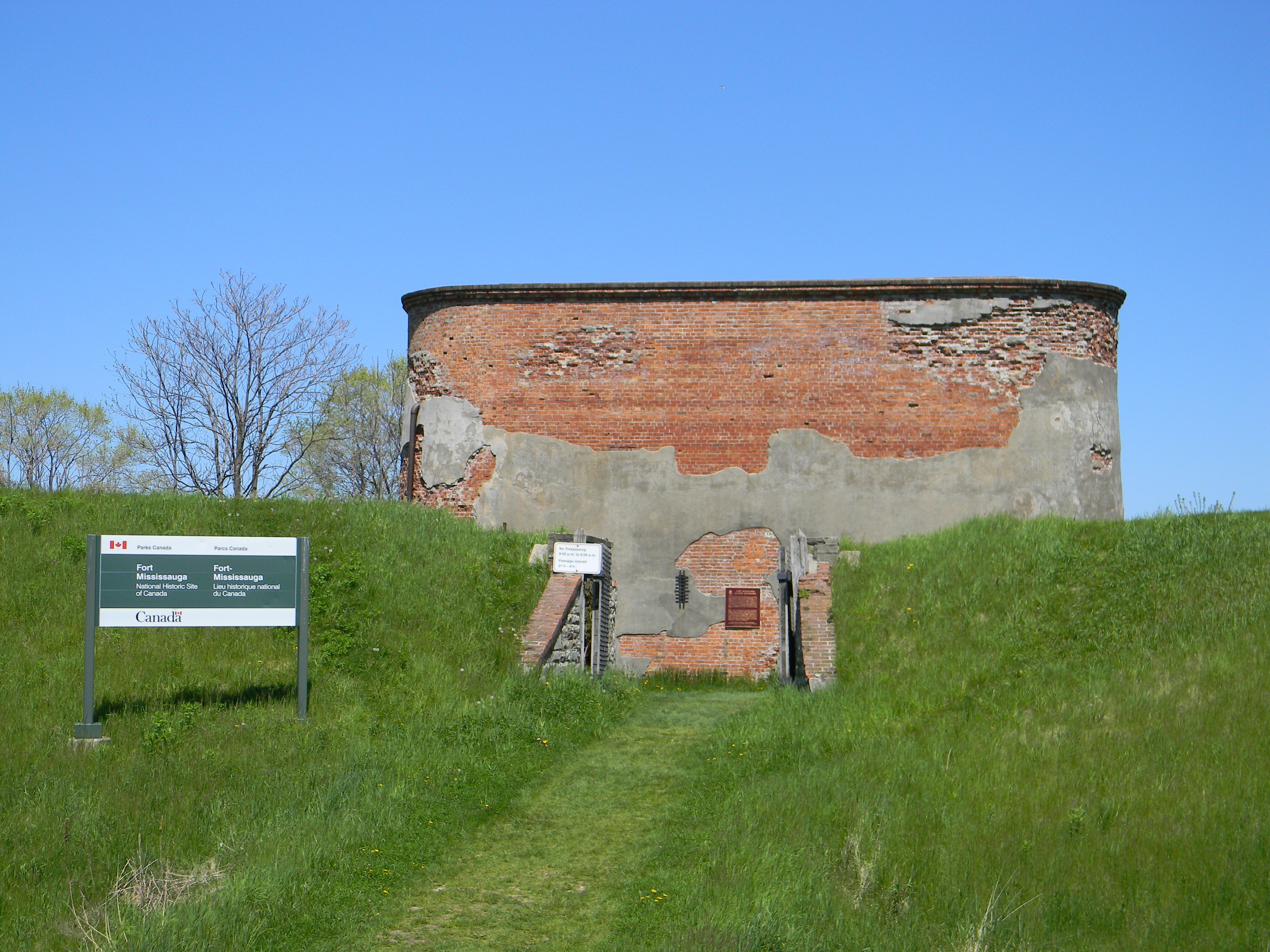
- Entrance to Fort Mississauga

- Location within Southern Ontario Location within Ontario Location within Canada
- 43°15′42″N 79°04′36″W
- Location: Niagara-on-the-Lake, Ontario, Canada

History
- Built: 1814
- Original use: Military fortification

Site notes
- Governing body: Parks Canada

National Historic Site of Canada
- Official name: Fort Mississauga National Historic Site of Canada
- Designated: 30 May 1960

Fort Mississauga National Historic Site is a fort on the shore of Lake Ontario, at the mouth of the Niagara River in Niagara-on-the-Lake, Ontario, Canada. The fort today consists of a box–shaped brick tower and historic star–shaped earthworks. The all–brick fort was built from 1814–1816 during the War of 1812, to replace nearby Fort George. It was built on a foundation of brick and stone salvaged from rubble left after retreating United States forces burned the nearby town of Newark (as Niagara-on-the-Lake was known then) in December, 1813. It would help in the defence of Upper Canada the following year, as part of a regional network that included Fort George, Navy Hall, and Butler's Barracks. However, the fort would not be completed until after the war.

== History ==
=== Earlier use ===
Before the fort was built, the site was used by at least three different First Nations: the Neutral (15th century); Seneca (late 17th century); and Mississauga (18th century). In 1804, a lighthouse was erected at the site, which had become known as Mississauga Point. This was the first lighthouse on the Great Lakes, but was dismantled in 1814 to make way for Fort Mississauga, which incorporated stone from the lighthouse. Mississauga Point Lighthouse was designated a National Historic Site in 1937, and is today commemorated within the walls of Fort Mississauga by a plaque erected by the Historic Sites and Monuments Board of Canada.

=== Building the fort ===
After the British captured Fort Niagara on 19 December 1813, Captain Runchey's Company of Coloured Men was attached to the Royal Engineers to help repair the fortifications at the mouth of the Niagara River. Whether race influenced the authorities' choice for this duty is not known, as one engineer later reported: "When I visited the Niagara Frontier … I found that a corps of Free Men of Colour had been raised … but had been turned over to that of the Engineers, any necessity for this I never could learn, but it seems to have been the fashion in Canada to heap all kinds of duties upon the latter." Toward the spring of 1814 the company was ordered to construct a new fort on the Canadian shore, dubbed Fort Mississauga, materials for which were obtained from the ruins of the nearby town of Newark. With the American navy now controlling Lake Ontario, this work was crucial to the security of British forces in the Niagara Peninsula, one British officer later noting "Mississauga … is a pretty little Fort, and would prevent vessels coming up the river." These duties consequently precluded the Coloured Corps' participation in the Niagara campaign that summer, even during the subsequent Siege of Fort Erie, where British forces desperately lacked trained engineer troops.

=== Use of the fort ===
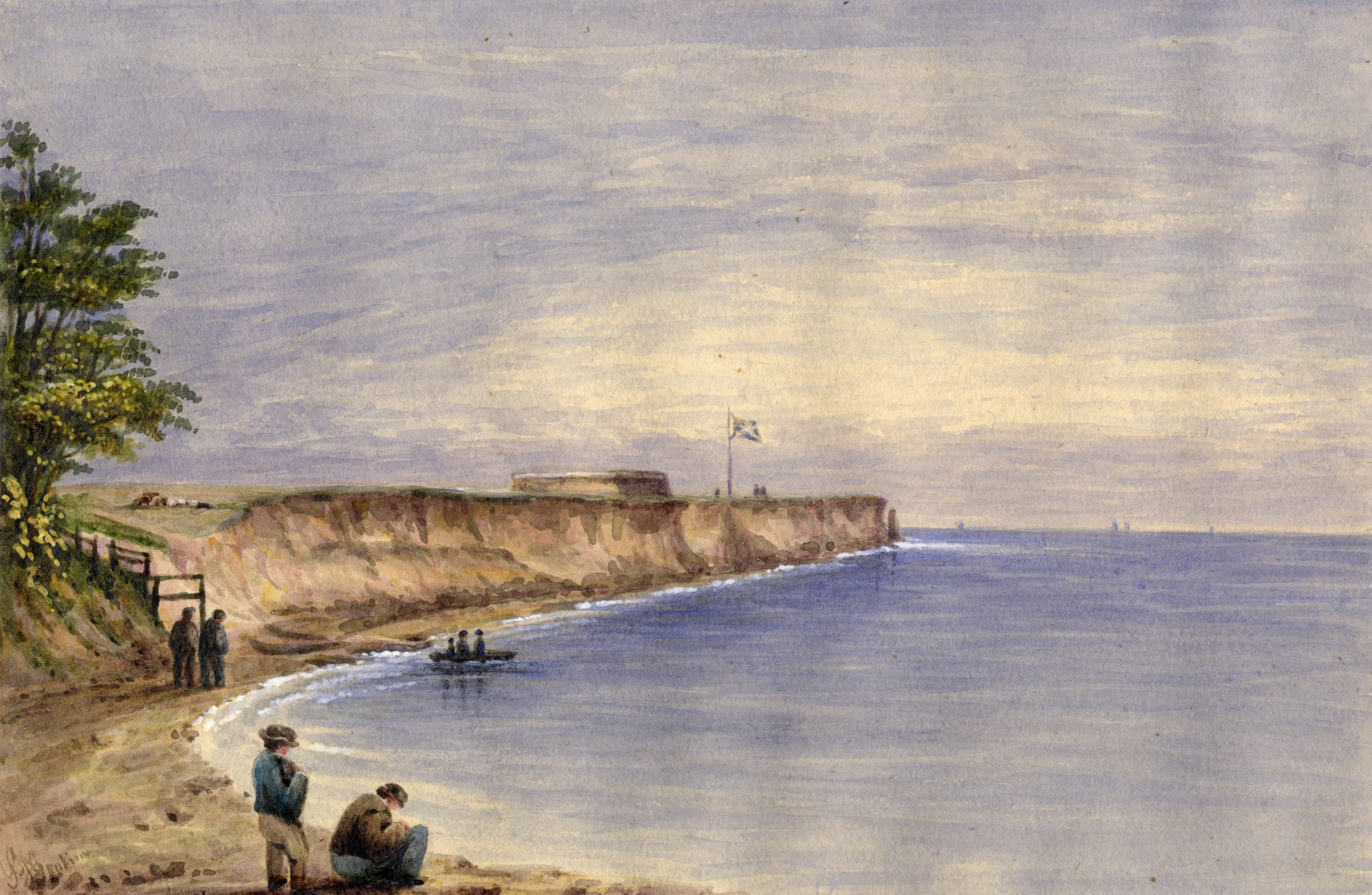
Fort Mississauga in use, c. 1860s.

The British Army was stationed at the fort from 1813 to 1855, followed by the Canadian Militia, which used it as summer training ground beginning in the 1870s, then during both World Wars and the Korean War. A golf course was laid out nearby in the late 1870s. Today, Niagara-on-the-Lake Golf Course surrounds the site, but public access is permitted via a walking path, with a warning to look out for golfers, who have the right of way. The path starts at the corner of Front and Simcoe streets.

The block house is the only building of the original fort to survive with all other buildings (mostly log structures) destroyed or dismantled. The interior of the blockhouse is closed, but has wooden staircases leading to some upper windows.

Fort Mississauga is a National Historic Site of Canada, and one of a handful of properties which comprise Niagara National Historic Sites, an administrative group managed by Parks Canada in the National Park System.

The Museum is affiliated with: CMA, CHIN, and Virtual Museum of Canada.

== See also ==
- List of forts
- Butler's Barracks
- Fort Erie
- Fort George
- Navy Hall
