= John Wallace Thomas =

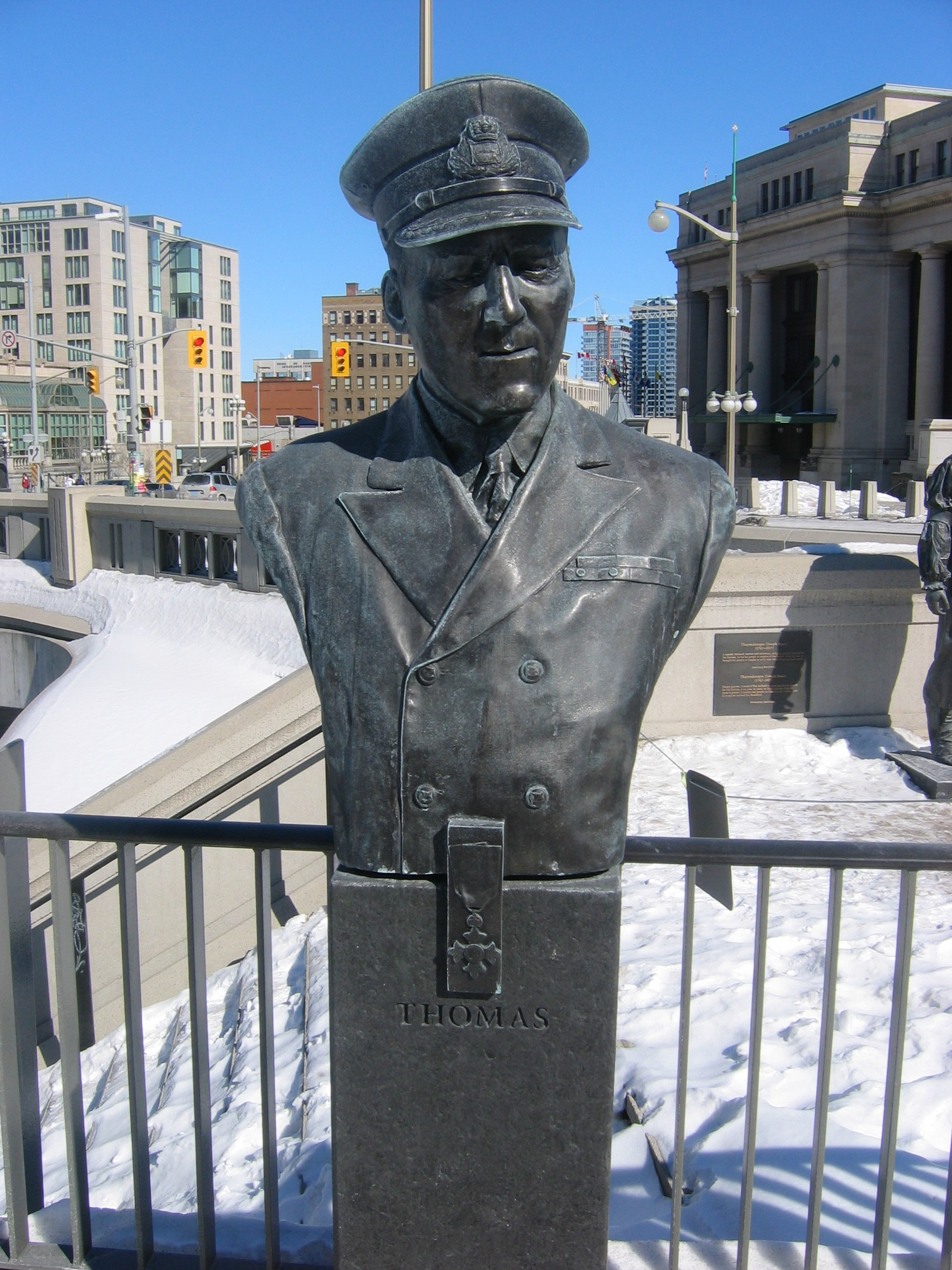
Statue of John Wallace Thomas in Ottawa.

John Wallace Thomas CBE (1888–1965) was a Newfoundland merchant mariner who served with distinction in the First and Second World Wars.

== Early life ==
Thomas was born in Newfoundland in 1885.

== Service history ==
=== Royal Naval Reserve ===
Blue Ensign flown by merchant vessels under the command of officers in the Royal Naval Reserve.

At the age of 20, Thomas left his hometown of Rose Blanche-Harbour le Cou for British Columbia to become a captain. The Pacific fleet of the Canadian Pacific Railway tended to hire its officers from the Royal Naval Reserves, and much was made of their long and faithful service to the company, including John Wallace, RNR.

=== Second World War ===
Thomas commanded the 26,000-ton Empress of Scotland (originally named RMS Empress of Japan) throughout the Second World War. He was made a Commander of the Order of the British Empire (CBE) for his handling of the ship during an attack by the Luftwaffe off the coast of Ireland on November 9, 1940. Captain Thomas was the only member of the Canadian Merchant Marine to receive the CBE during the war.

Thomas died in Vancouver, British Columbia, in 1965. He is one of fourteen figures from Canada's military history to be commemorated at the Valiants Memorial in Ottawa, Ontario.
