= Valiants Memorial =

Military monument in Ontario, Canada

- Monument aux Valeureux
- Canadian Heritage, National Capital Commission, Valiants Foundation
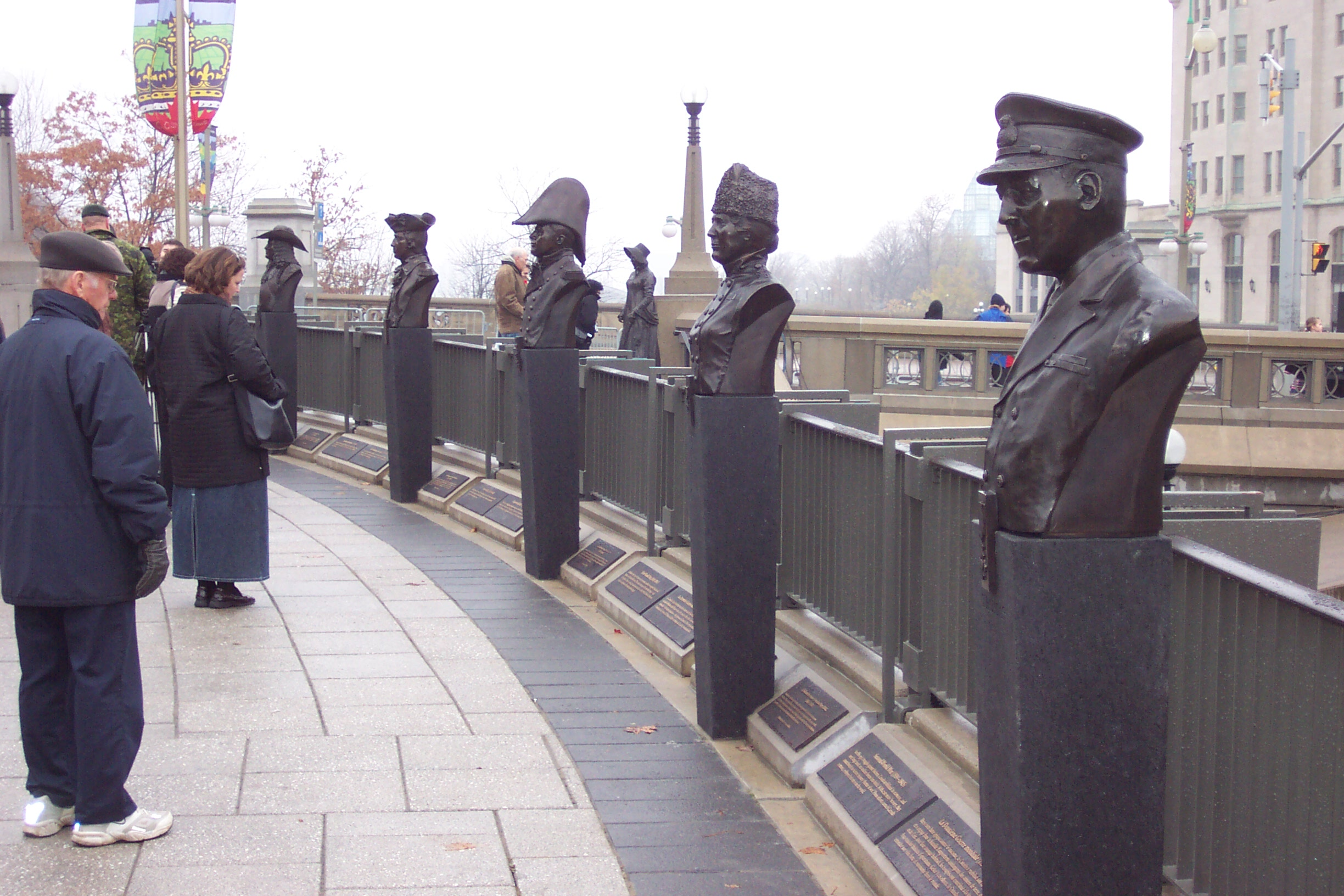
- Five busts on the west side of the memorial represent each of the five military periods
- For fourteen key figures from the military history of the country
- Unveiled: 5 November 2006
- Location: Ottawa, Ontario Canada
- Designed by: Marlene Hilton Moore, John McEwen

The Valiants Memorial (French: Monument aux Valeureux) is a military monument located in Ottawa, Ontario, Canada. It commemorates fourteen key figures from the military history of Canada. Dedicated by Governor General Michaëlle Jean on 5 November 2006, the work consists of nine busts and five statues, all life-sized, by artists Marlene Hilton Moore and John McEwen.

The monument was installed around the Sappers Staircase, an underpass on the northeastern corner of Confederation Square, adjacent to the National War Memorial. The wall of the staircase is decorated with a quotation from the Aeneid by Virgil:

"Nulla dies umquam memori vos eximet aevo"

which translates to "No day will ever erase you from the memory of time" (French: Aucun jour ne t'effacera jamais de la mémoire du temps).

The heroes commemorated in the monument are:

- From the French Regime (1534–1763):

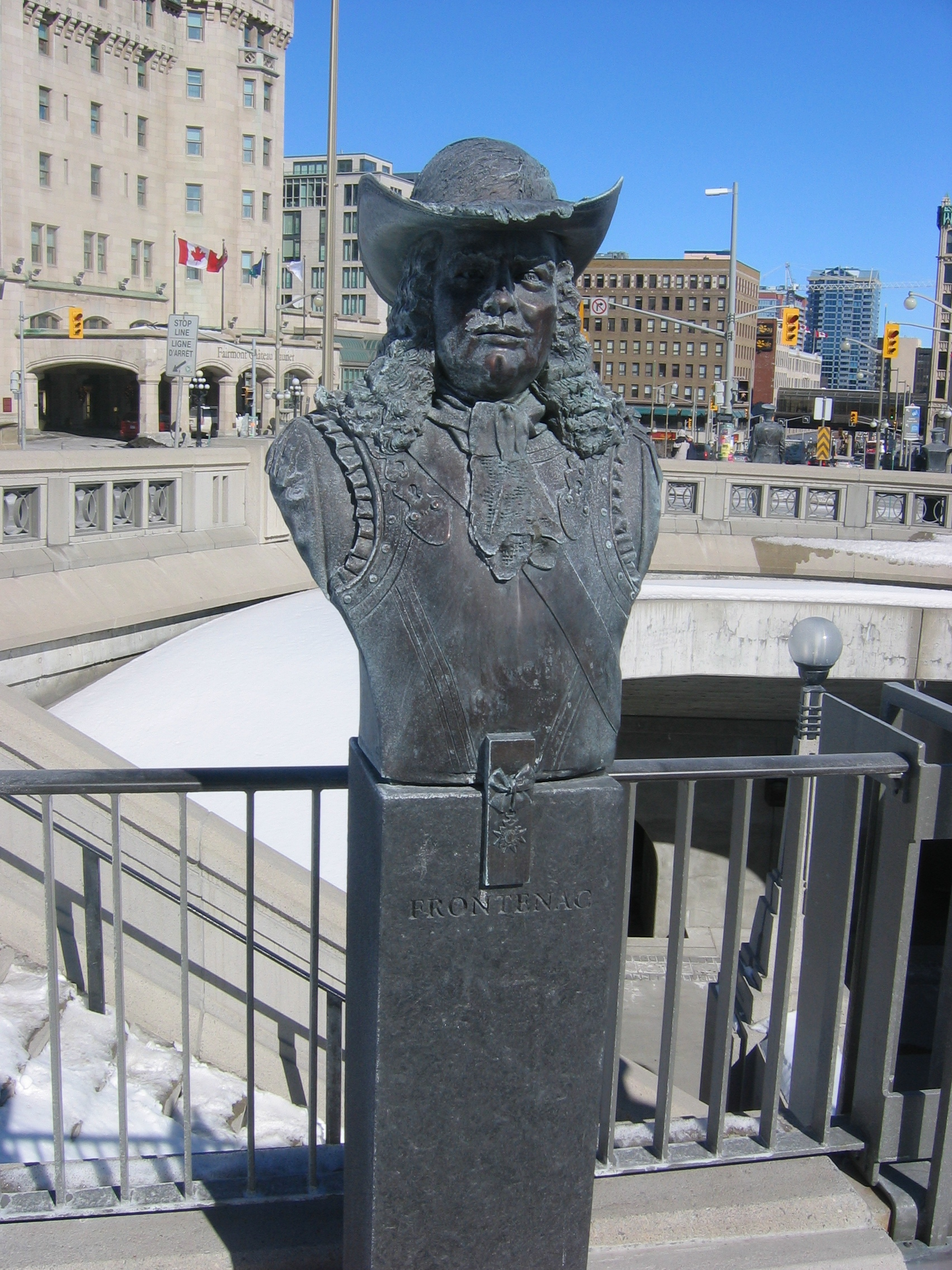
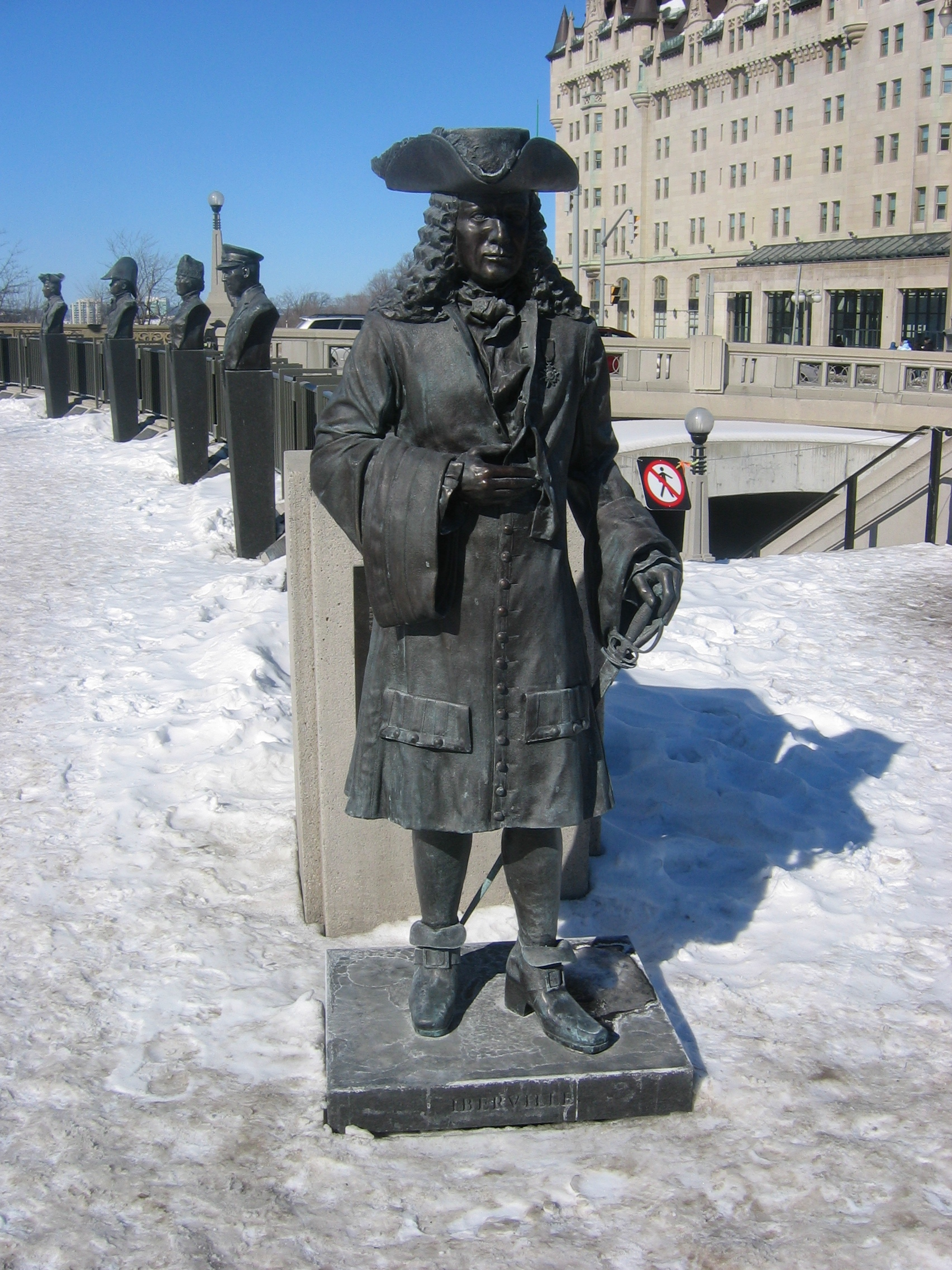
Hero	Type	Image
Le comte de Frontenac	bust
Pierre Le Moyne d'Iberville	statue

- From the American Revolution (1775–1783):

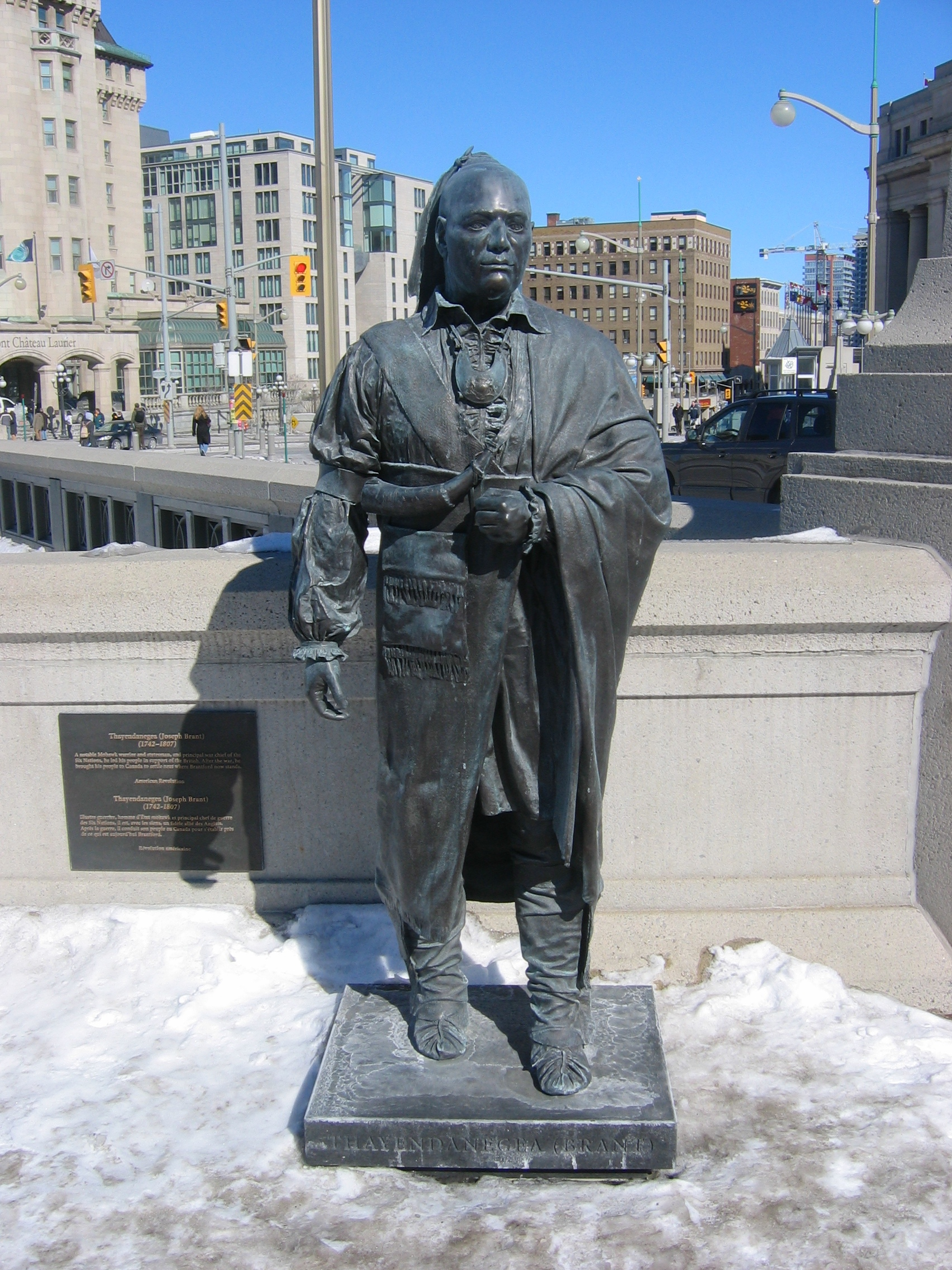
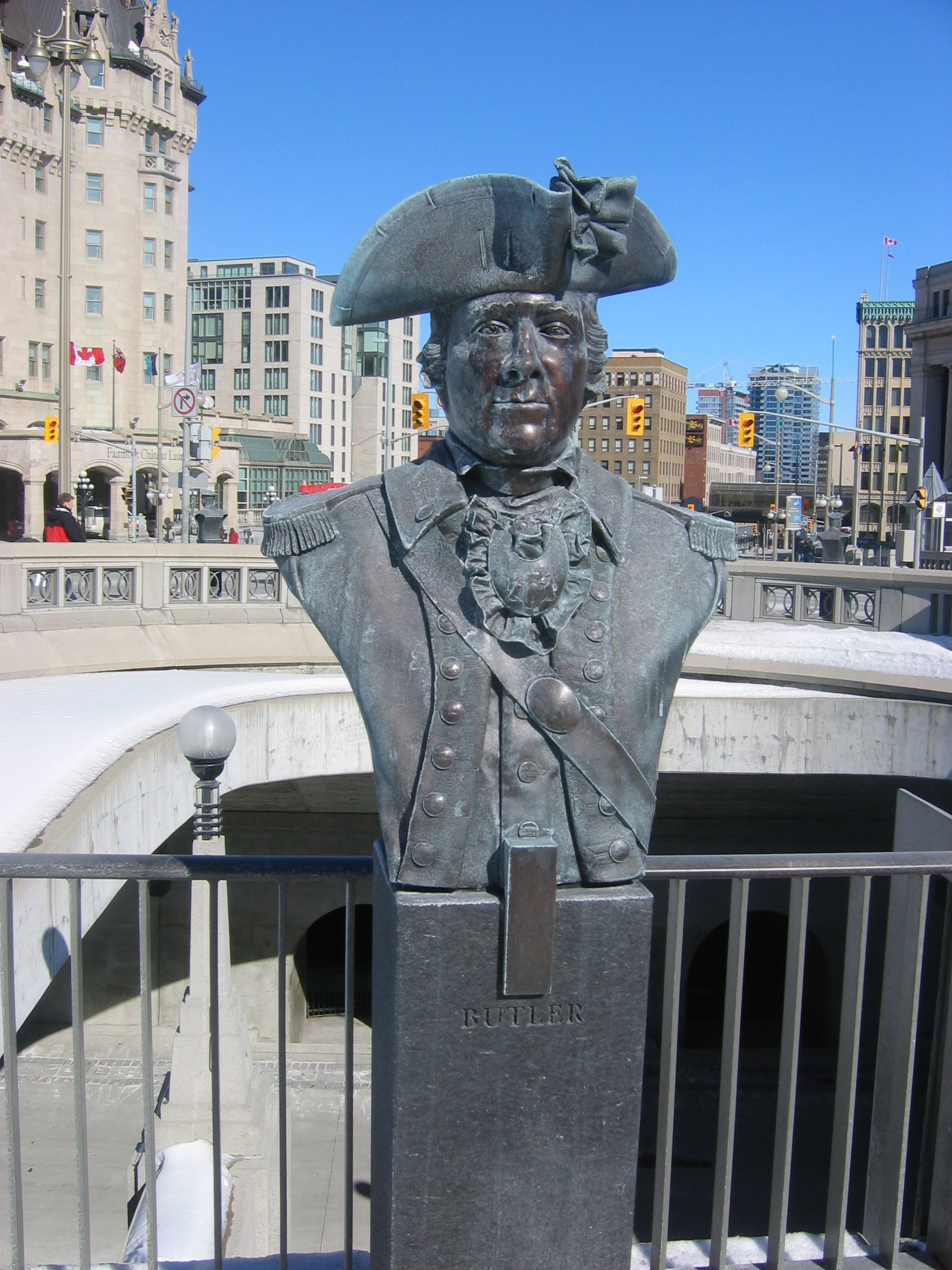
Hero	Type	Image
Thayendanegea (Joseph Brant)	statue
John Butler	bust

- From the War of 1812 (1812–1815):

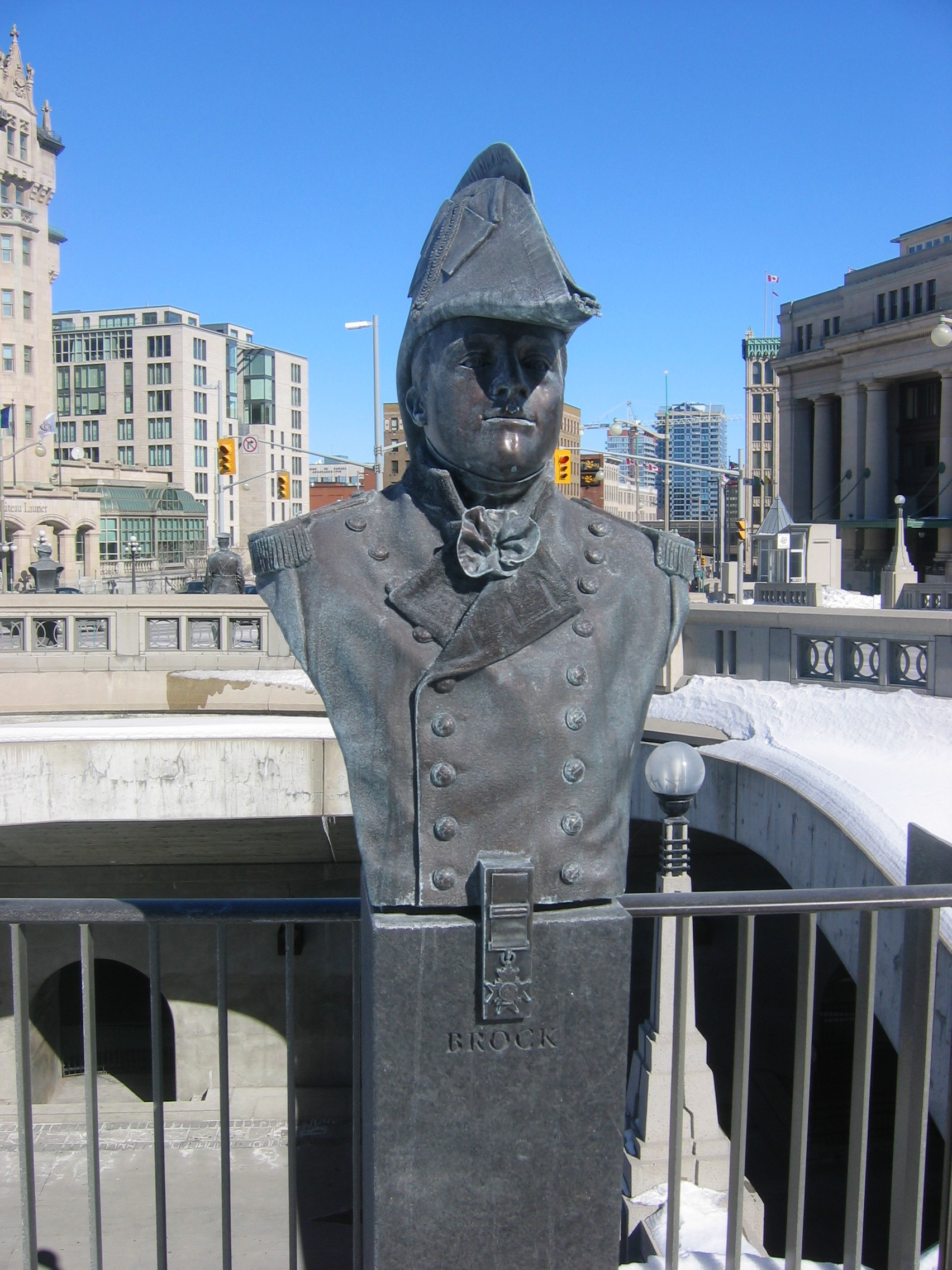
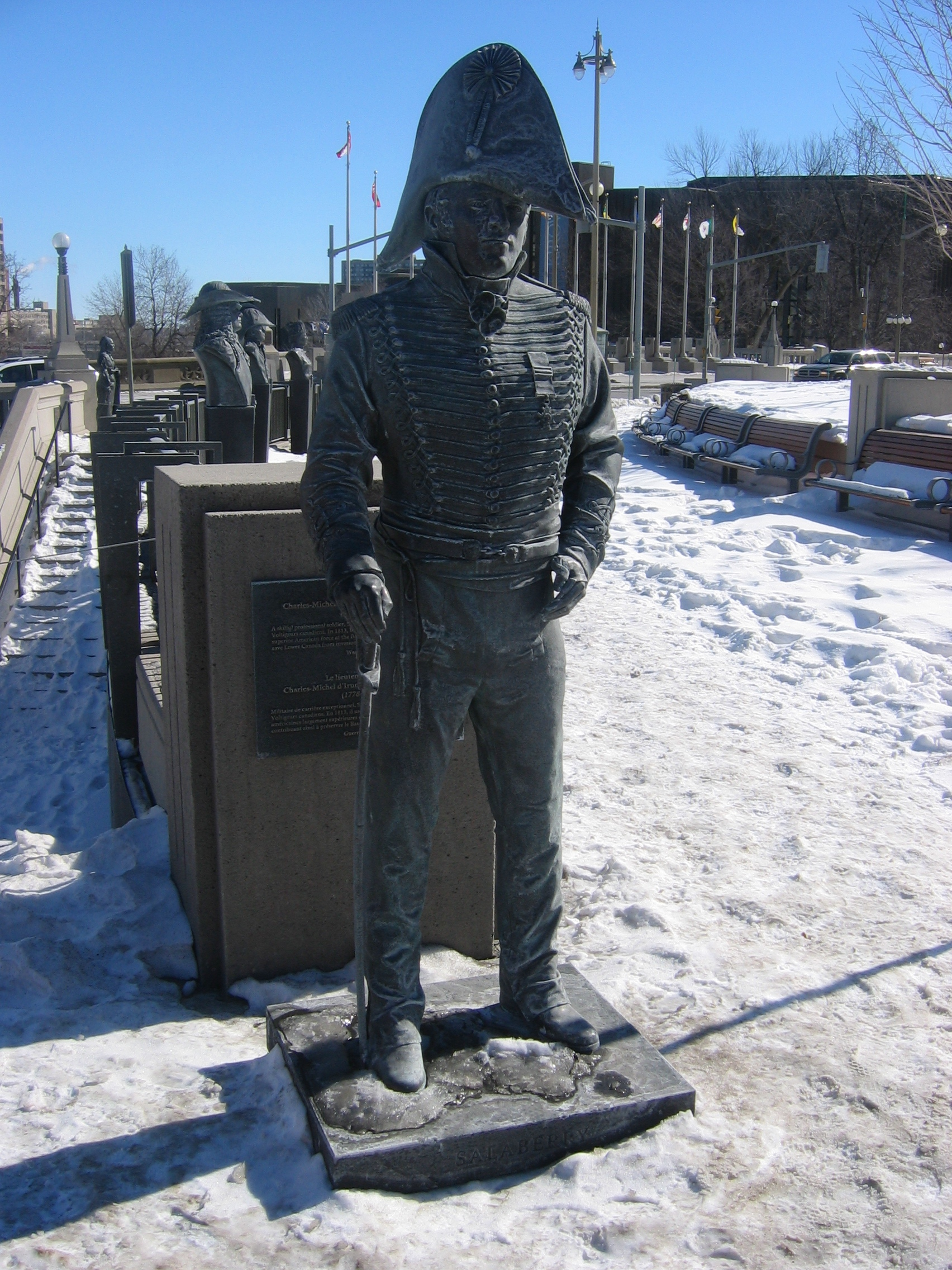
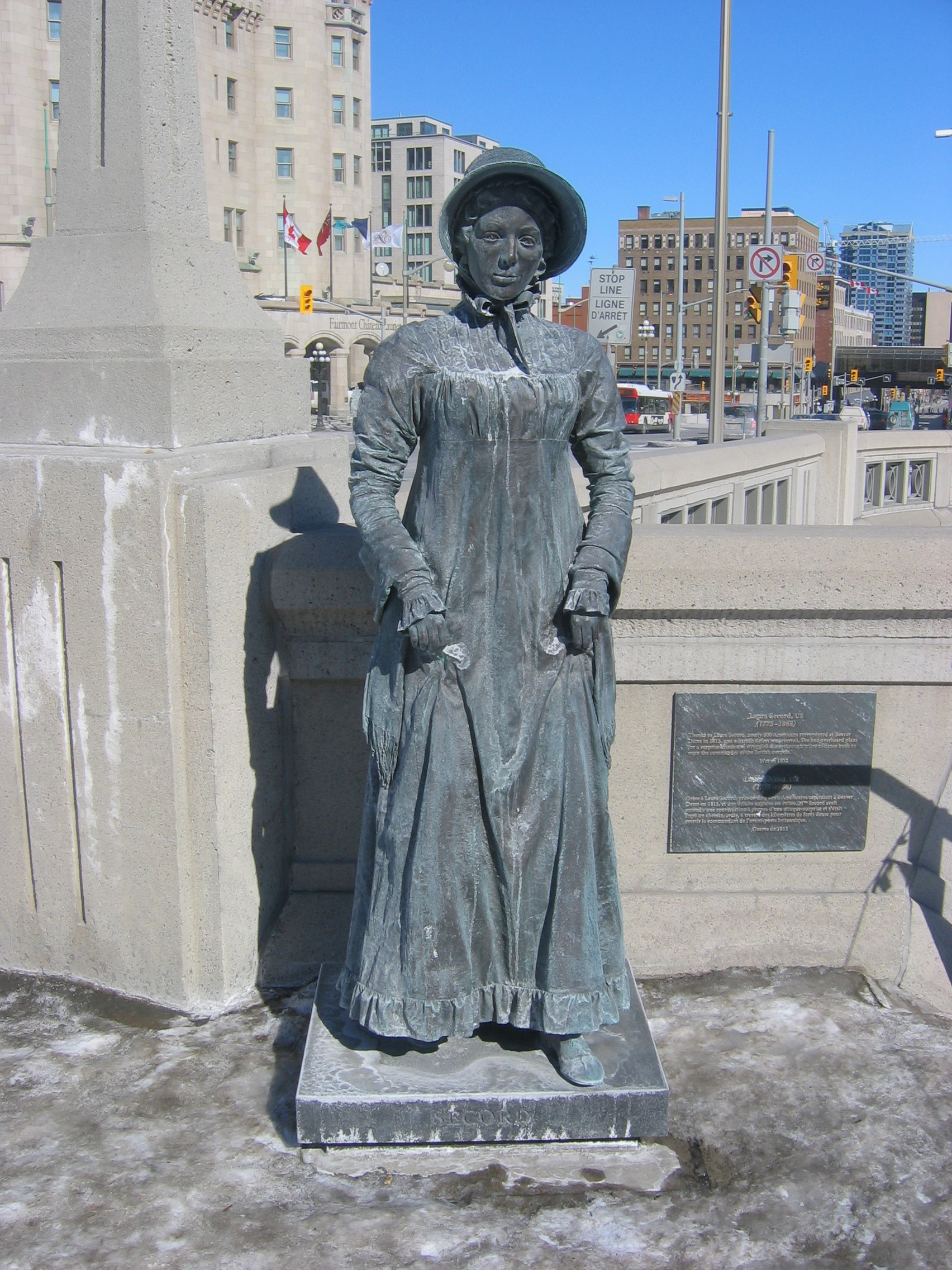
Hero	Type	Image
Major-General Sir Isaac Brock, KB	bust
Charles de Salaberry	statue
Laura Secord	statue

- From the First World War (1914–1918):

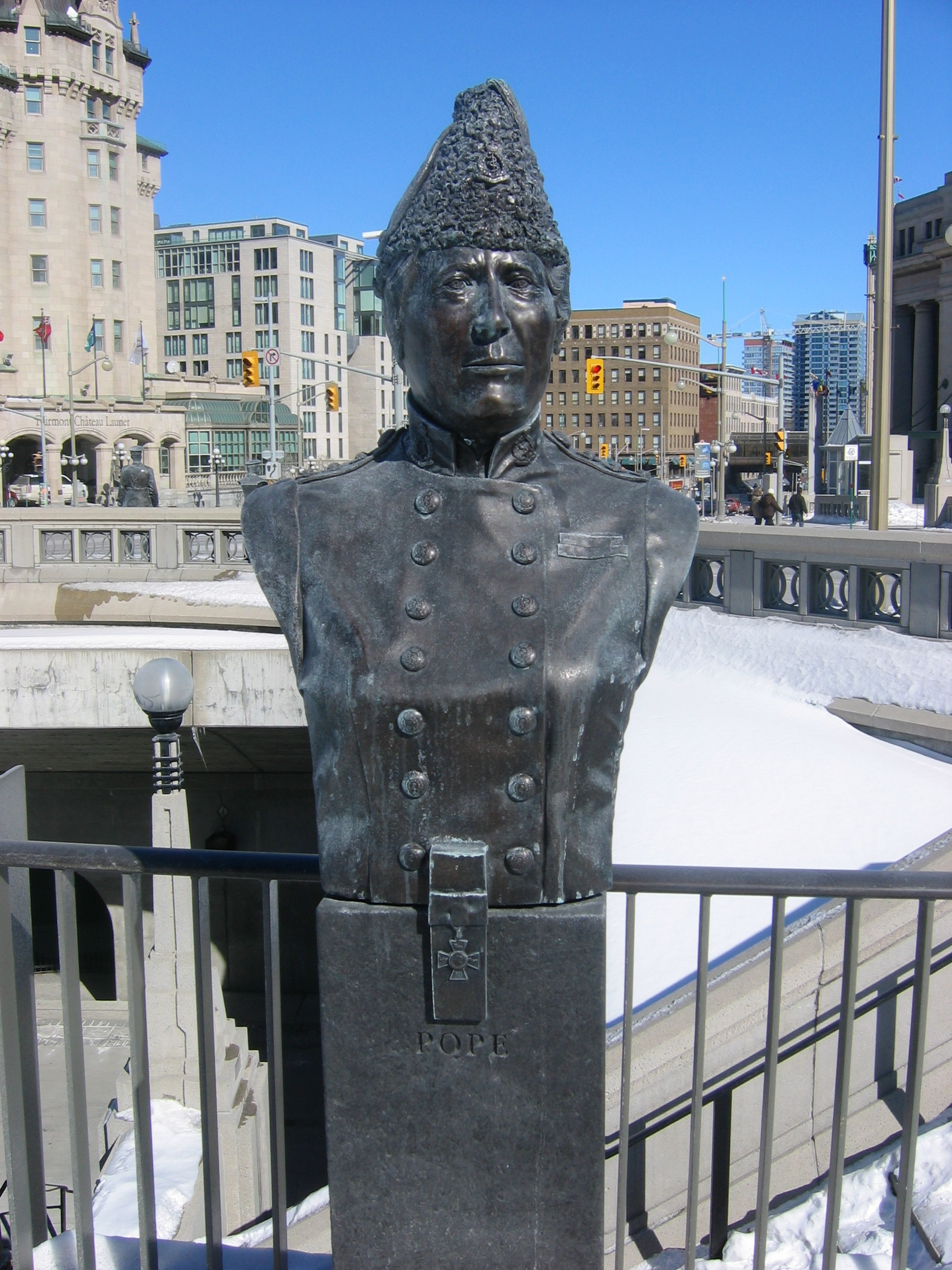
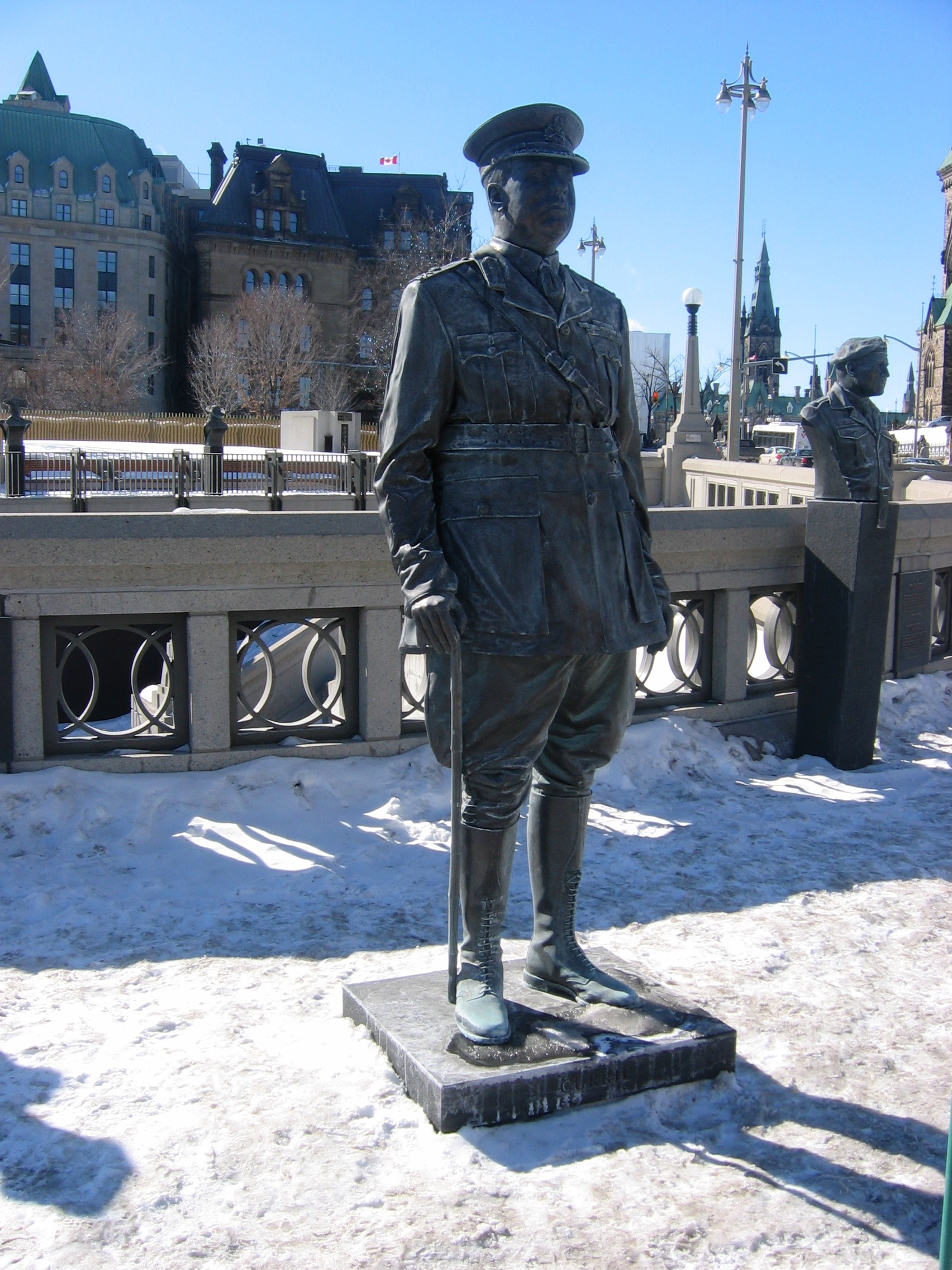
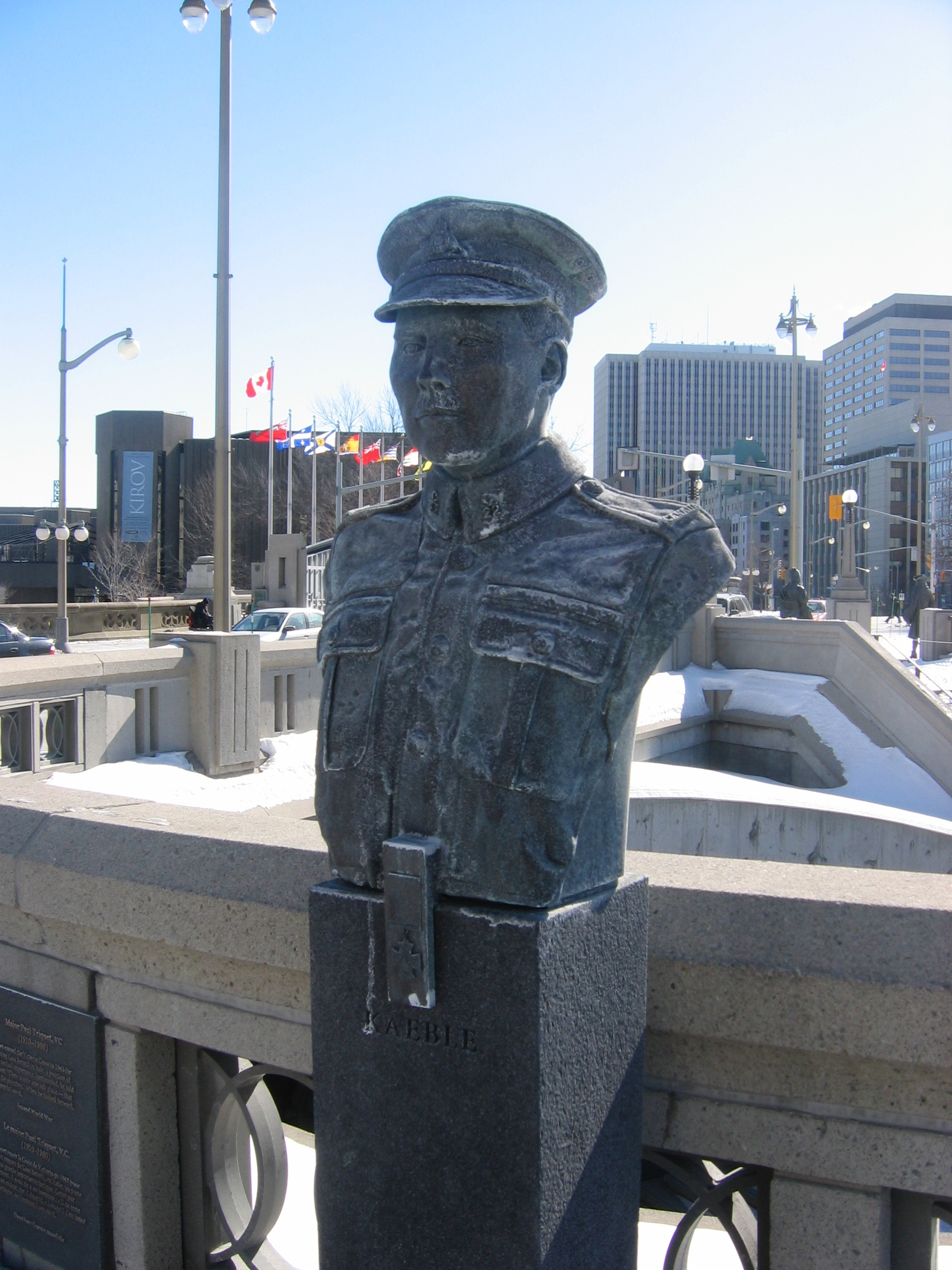
Hero	Type	Image
Georgina Pope	bust
General Sir Arthur Currie, GCMG, KCB	statue
Corporal Joseph Kaeble, VC, MM	bust

- From the Second World War (1938–1945):

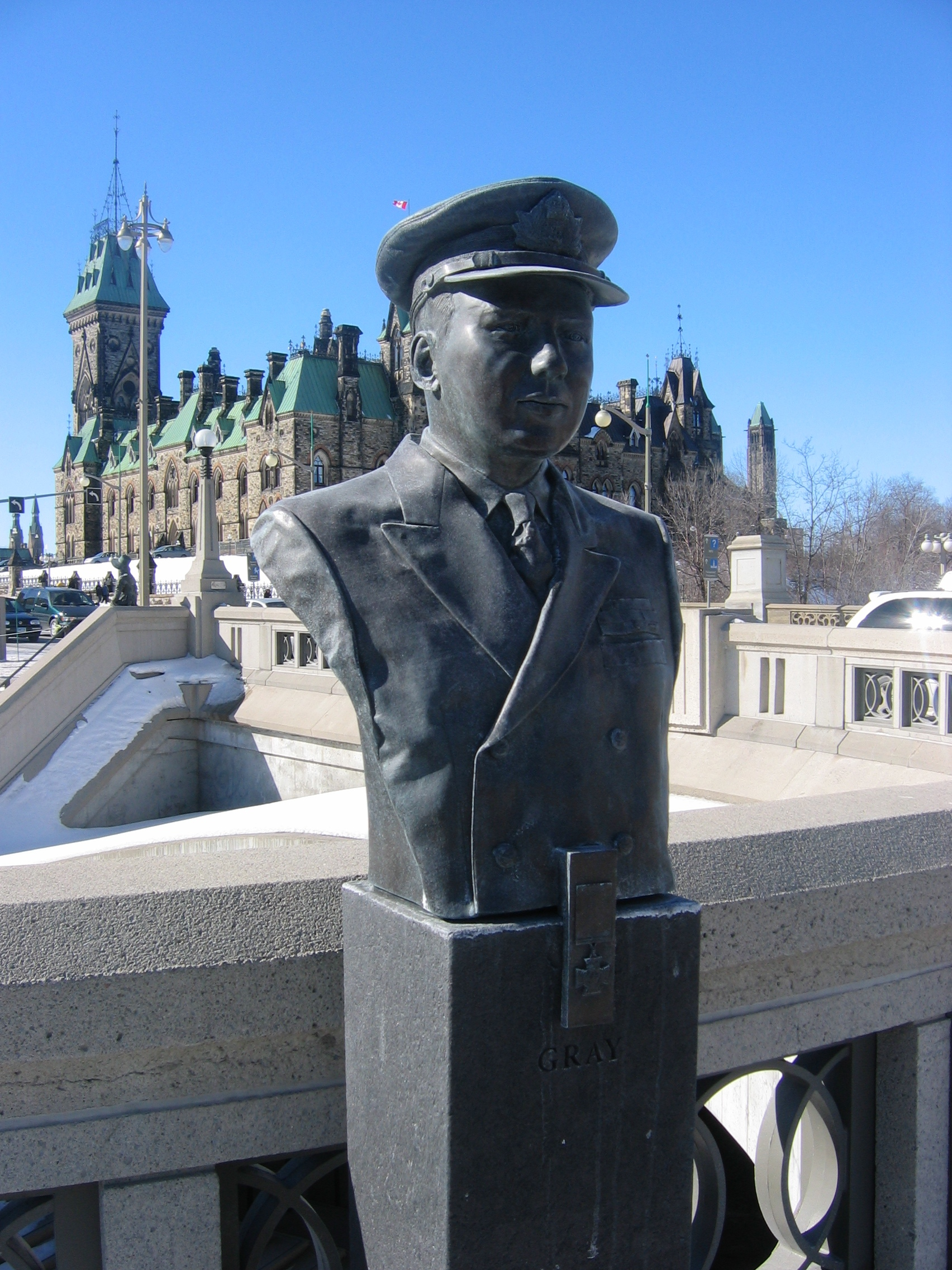
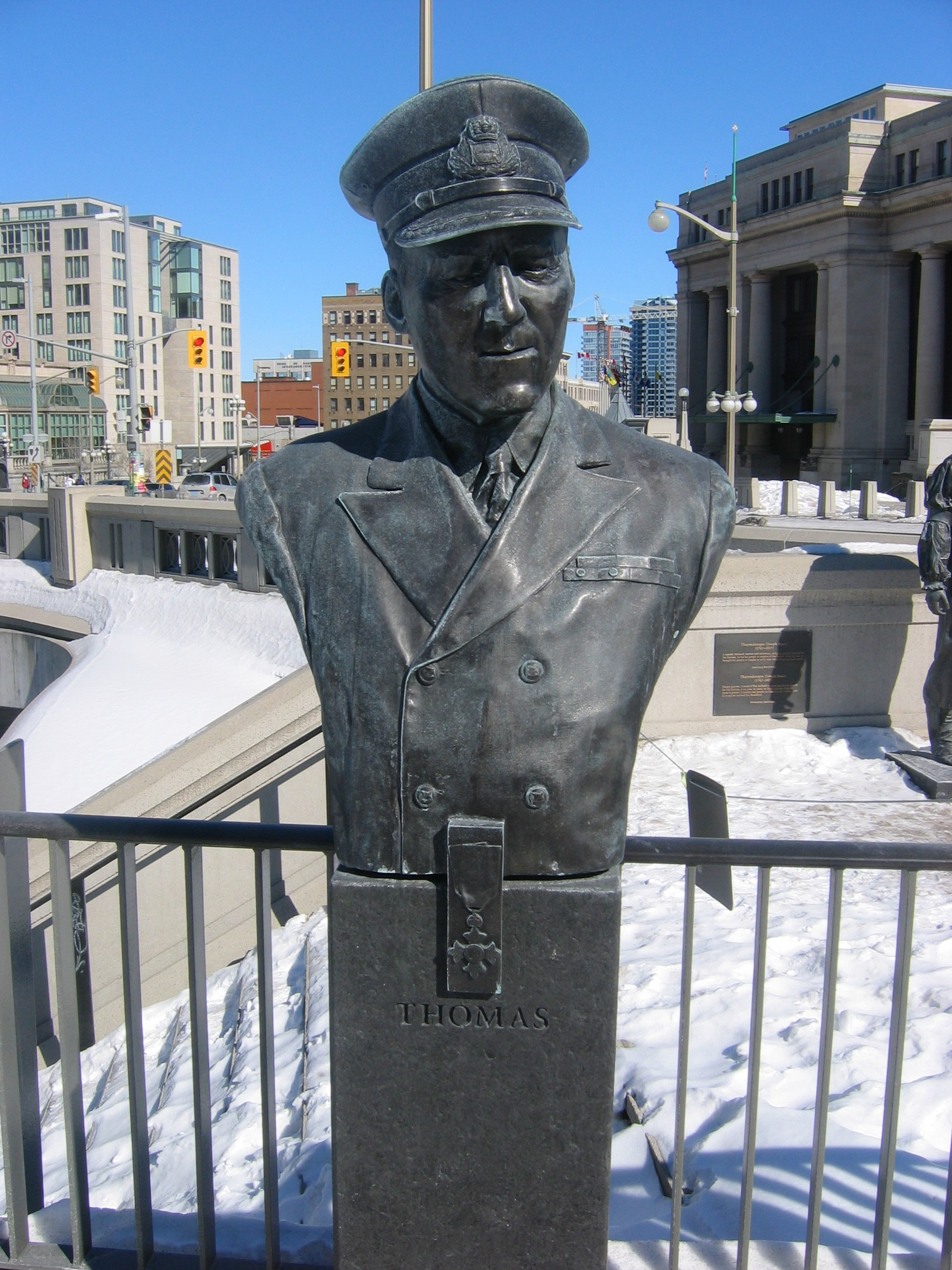
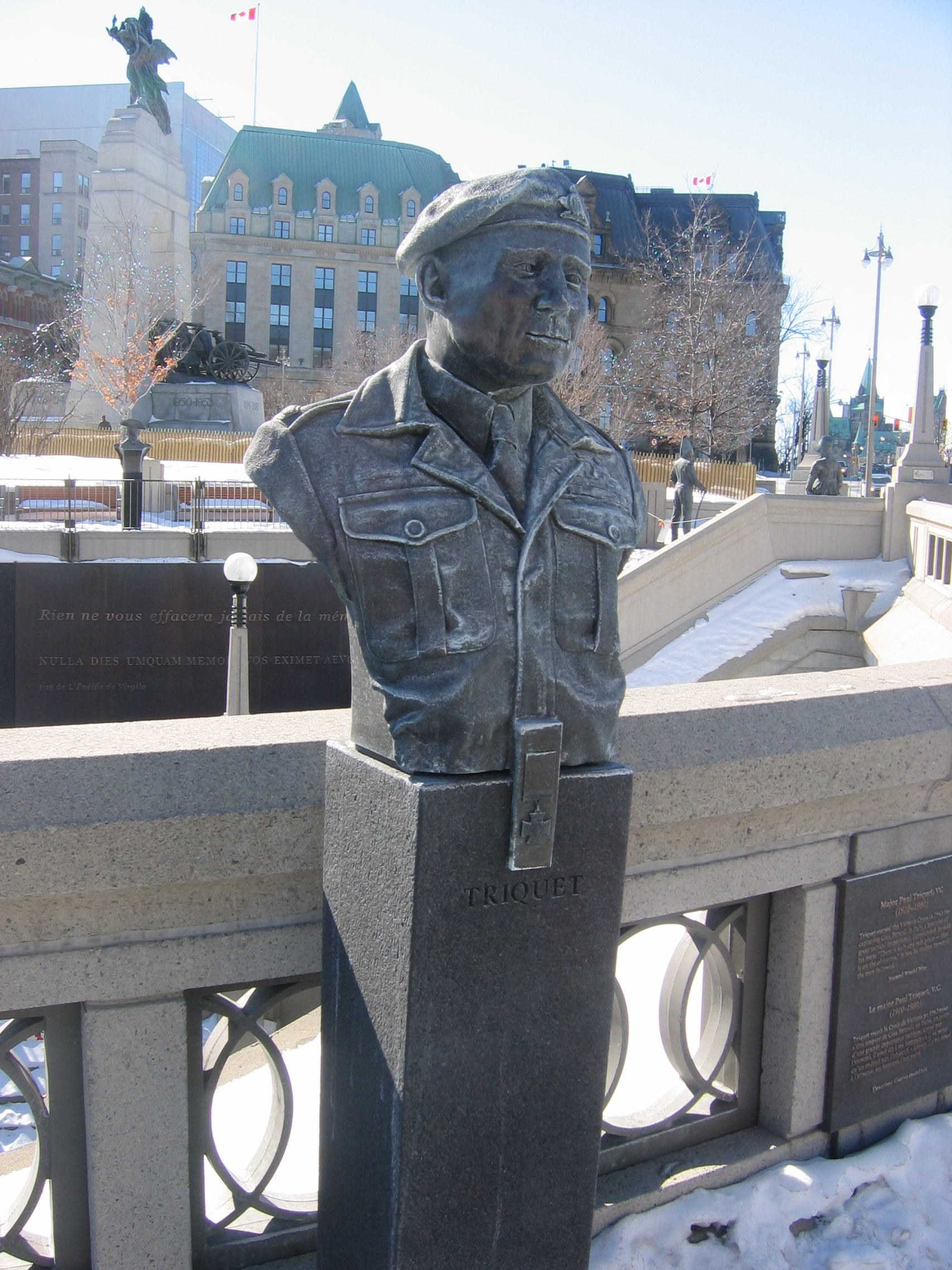
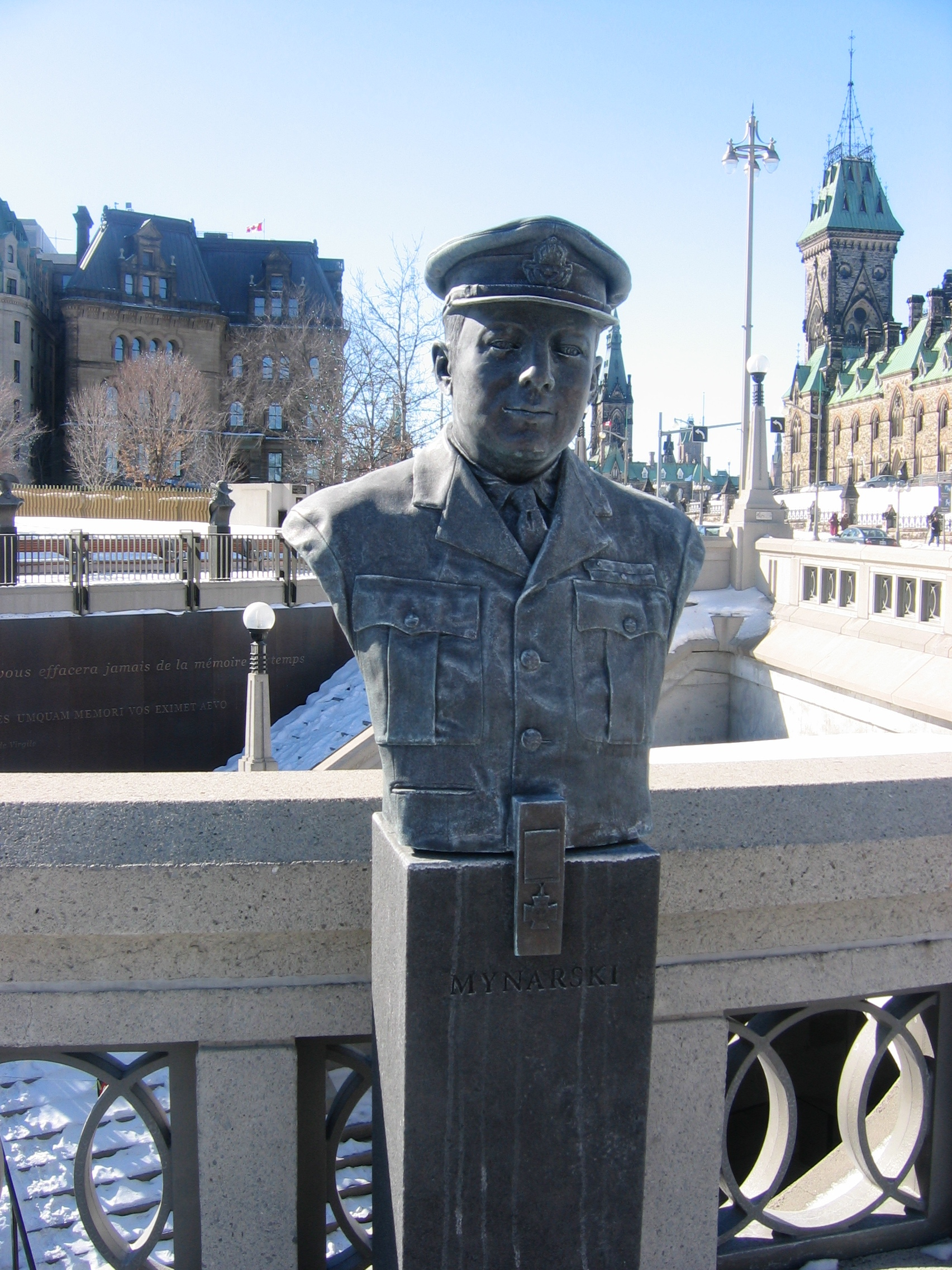
Hero	Type	Image
Lieutenant Robert Hampton Gray, VC, DSC	bust
Captain John Wallace Thomas, CBE	bust
Major Paul Triquet, VC, CD	bust
Pilot Officer Andrew Mynarski, VC	bust
