= Georgina Pope =

Canadian nurse (1862–1938)

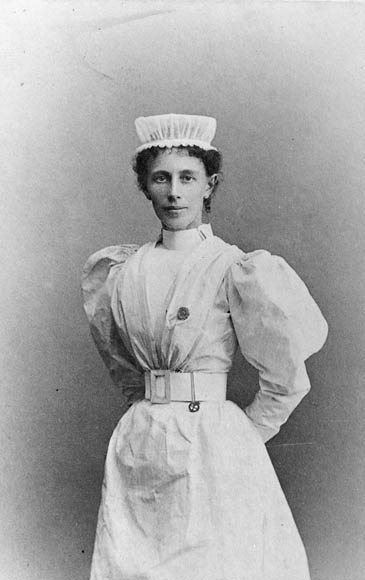
- Georgina Pope in c. 1898
- Born: January 1, 1862; Charlottetown, Prince Edward Island
- Died: June 6, 1938 (aged 76); Charlottetown, Prince Edward Island
- Military career
- Allegiance: Canada
- Branch: Canadian Militia
- Service years: 1899–1919
- Rank: Matron
- Unit: Canadian Army Nursing Service
- Conflicts: Second Boer War; First World War
- Awards: Royal Red Cross

Cecily Jane Georgina Fane Pope, RRC (January 1, 1862 – June 6, 1938) was a Canadian nurse who served with distinction in the Second Boer War and the First World War.

== Early life ==
Georgina Pope was born on January 1, 1862, in Charlottetown, Prince Edward Island. The daughter of William Pope, a Father of Confederation, she was a product of Prince Edward Island gentility and could have become an island socialite. However, she instead traveled to New York, where she trained as a nurse at Bellevue Hospital.

== Nursing career ==
After the training, Pope became the superintendent of the Columbia Hospital for Women, at Washington D.C., where she opened a school for nurses.

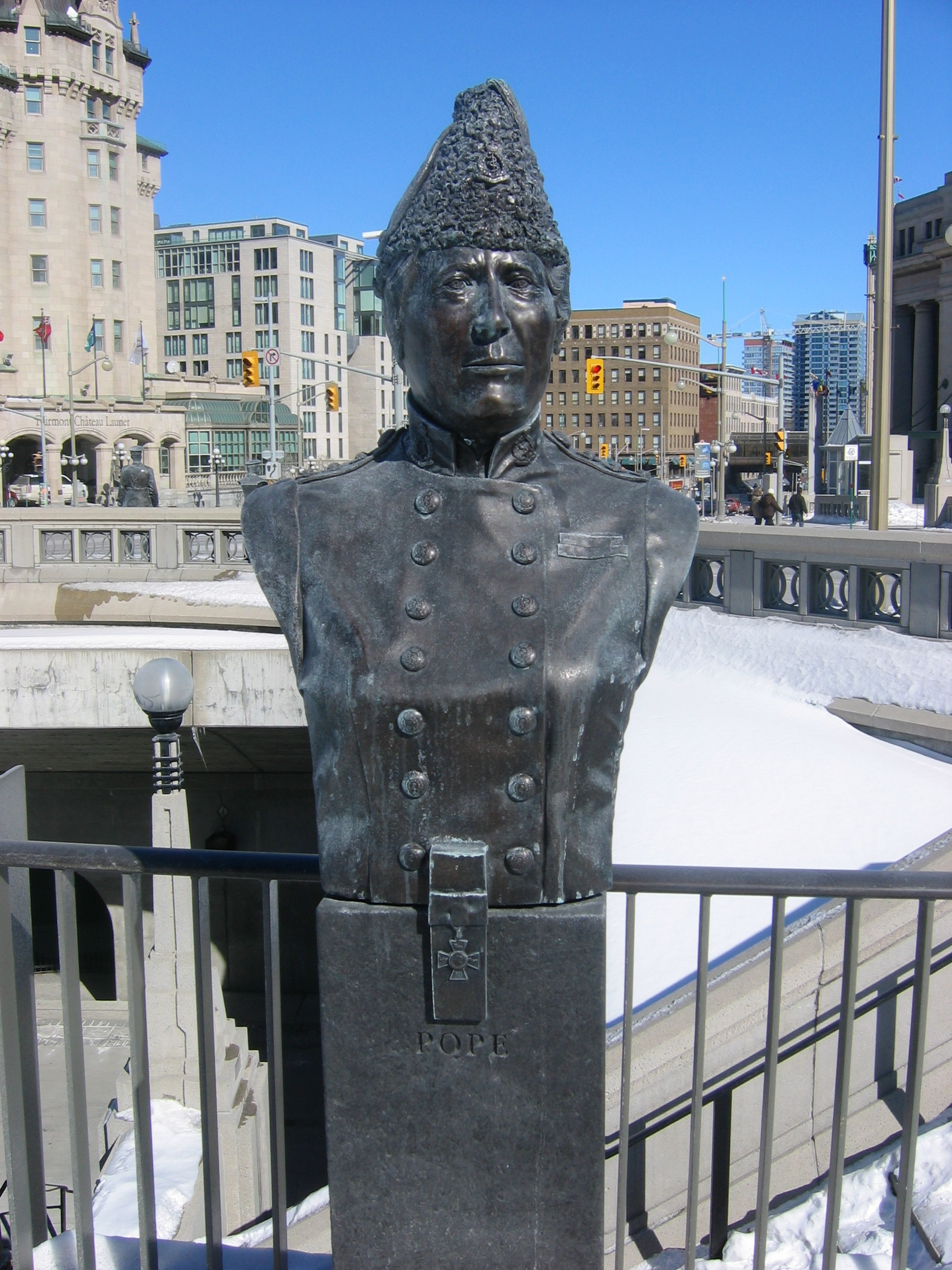
Statue of Pope in Ottawa

In October 1899, after completing nursing studies at Bellevue Hospital in New York City, Pope volunteered for nursing service in the Second Boer War. Placed in command of the first group of nurses to go overseas, she served for more than a year in South Africa. For the first five months she and four other volunteer nurses served at British hospitals north of Cape Town. After, Pope and another sister proceeded north to Kroonstad where, despite shortages in food and medical supplies, they took charge of a military hospital and successfully cared for 230 sufferers of enteric fever.

On September 21, 1901, Pope, along with two other nurses, Deborah Hurcomb and Sarah Forbes, received medals for their war service from the Duke of York, later King George V, during his tour to the Outposts of the British Empire. She returned there in 1902 with the Canadian Army Nursing Service as senior sister in charge of a second group of 8 Canadian nurses. She served at a hospital in Natal until the end of the war in May that year. On October 31, 1902, she became the first Canadian to be awarded the Royal Red Cross, awarded to her for meritorious and distinguished service in the field.

In 1908 Pope was appointed first matron of the Canadian Army Medical Corps.

In 1917, aged 55, Pope, although in poor health went to work near Ypres and served for the remainder of the First World War until 1918.

== Later life ==
Pope served in England and France during the First World War.

Pope died June 6, 1938. She was granted a full military funeral. Pope is one of fourteen figures from Canada's military history commemorated at the Valiants Memorial in Ottawa.

== Legacy ==
In 2012, Canadian artist Laurie McGaw designed a five-dollar coin in honour of four nurses. Pope stands in the foreground of the coin in front of three others. The coin is made of fine silver and is 99.99% pure, and its production was limited to 10,000.

== Sources ==
- Toman, Cynthia (7 March 2016). "Georgina Fane Pope". The Canadian Encyclopedia (online ed.). Historica Canada.
- Collections Canada: Georgina Pope Government of Canada Archives
- War Museum of Canada: Georgina Pope War Museum of Canada
