= Deborah Hurcomb =

Canadian nurse

- circa 1900
- Born: Deborah Jane Hurcomb; 1867; Montreal, Quebec, Canada
- Died: 28 February 1907 (aged 39–40); Buffalo, New York
- Occupation: nurse
- Years active: 1885-1907
- Known for: nursing supervisor of the 2nd Boer War

Deborah Hurcomb (1867-1908) was a Canadian nurse who was trained in Montreal and served in the Second Boer War. She was one of two nursing supervisors from Canada who served in South Africa and was decorated for her service by the Duke of York, later King George V, in 1901.

== Early life ==
Deborah Jane Hurcomb was born in 1867 in Montreal, Quebec, Canada to Catharine (née Montgomery) and Philip William Hurcomb. Hurcomb's mother was Canadian and her father was a British military officer. A few weeks after her birth, her parents moved to Alverstoke, Hampshire, England. She grew up and was educated there, before the family returned to Canada. Hurcomb completed her nursing training at the Montreal General Hospital.

== Career ==
Hurcomb began working as a private nurse in Montreal and around 1899 moved to Ottawa to become the superintendent of the Perley Home for Incurables. In 1900, she volunteered to serve as a nurse during the Second Boer War and became a superintendent of the second Canadian nursing contingent. The nurses were given a rank equivalent to that of a lieutenant and were treated as officers. In February 1900, Hurcomb sailed aboard the S. S. Laurentian with nurses Margaret L. Horne, Margaret Clotilde MacDonald and Marcella P. Richardson to join the first contingent of nurses at the Number 3 Hospital at Rondebosch. After two weeks in Rondebosch, the group left for Kimberley, where they served in a makeshift hospital of one hundred beds located in the Masonic Temple. An outbreak of dysentery and enteric caused them to relocate to Bloemfontein six weeks later to help with the epidemic. Each of the nurses, except MacDonald, contracted the disease, but continued their work to provide services for the sick and wounded. In July, 1900, Hurcomb led her group of nurses to Pretoria, where they served at the Irish Hospital, until their return aboard the Roslyn Castle from Cape Town to Halifax, Nova Scotia in December 1900.

In 1901, Hurcomb, along with two other nurses, Georgina Pope and Sarah Forbes, received medals for their war service from the Duke of York, later King George V, during his tour to the Outposts of the British Empire. She returned to South Africa in early 1902 with Forbes, MacDonald and Pope. The veterans were accompanied by four other nurses, Florence Cameron, Eleanor Fortescue, Amy W. Scott, and Margaret Smith. They did not serve as members of the Canadian Army Nursing Service, but rather as members of the British Army's temporary units. They accompanied the 2nd Battalion, Canadian Mounted Rifles (2 CMR) to Harrismith, where they were to be attached to the Canadian 10th Field Hospital. As that hospital had moved on to Newcastle, the nurses instead joined the 19th Stationary Hospital located between the Drakensberg hills and a small mountain called Platberg. Hurcomb and the other nurses were responsible for around 600 patients who had enteric fever. She had not fully recovered from her previous bout with the disease and succumbed to it again, having to be evacuated back to Canada in May. After her recovery, Hurcomb worked as a private nurse in Ottawa.

Hurcomb died while on a visit to her father at his home in Buffalo, New York on 28 February 1907 and was buried in Ottawa.
