= Gordon House (Amherstburg) =

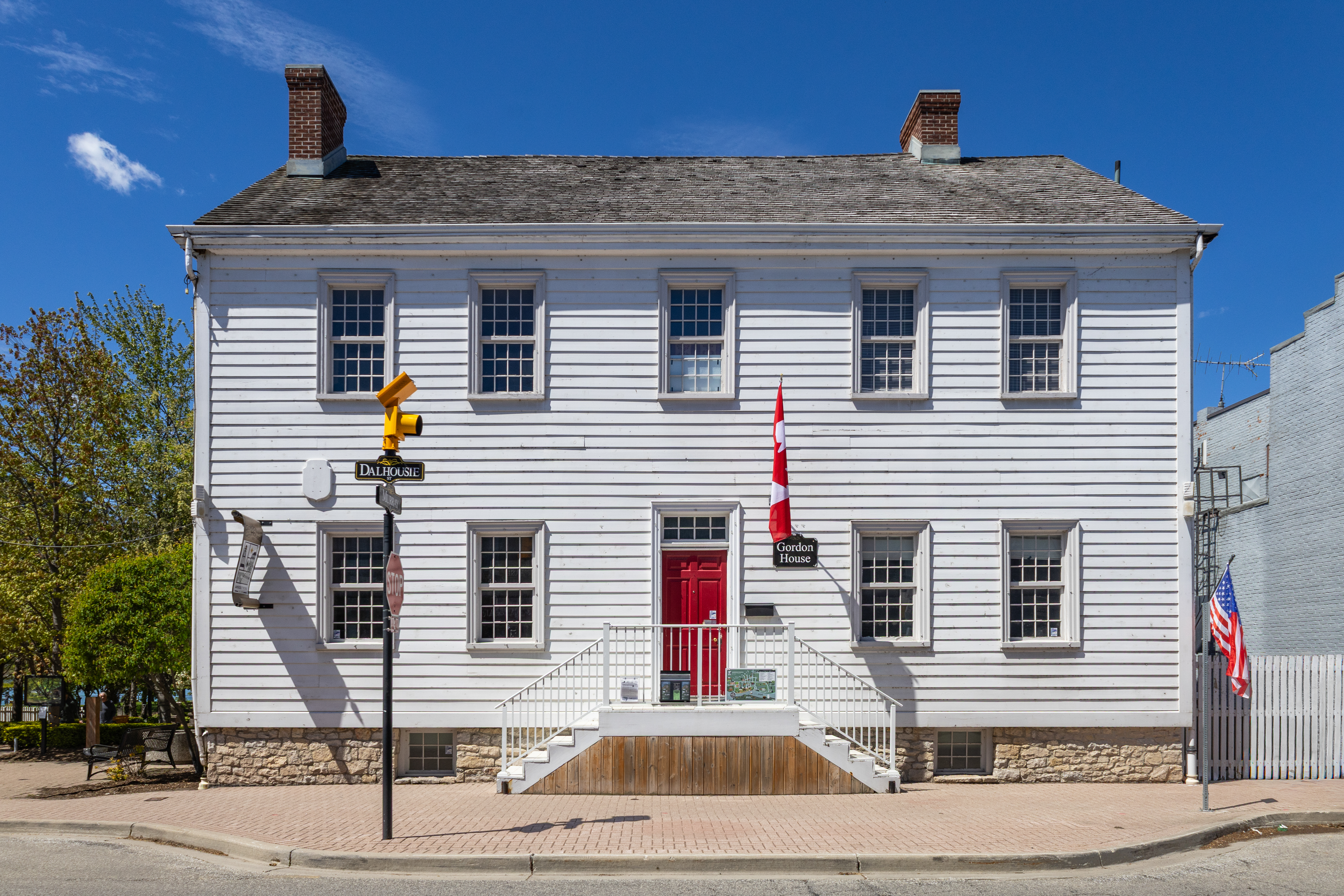
- Gordon House in 2026
- Interactive map of the Gordon House area

General information
- Location: 266 Dalhousie Street, Amherstburg, Ontario, Canada
- Coordinates: 42°06′06.5″N 83°06′46.0″W
- Year built: 1798
- Owner: Town of Amherstburg

Design and construction
- Designations: Ontario Heritage Act (1976, 1988)

The Gordon House is a historic house in Amherstburg, Ontario, Canada. Built in 1798, two years after the town's establishment, the house was situated along the Detroit River in the merchants' quarters. Inhabited for fifteen years by William Mills, the house was used as a billet by American occupation forces during the War of 1812. After the war, the house was purchased by Mills's executor James Gordon, who became the local member of parliament in 1820. In subsequent years, the three-storey Georgian house was occupied by several families, including the coal merchant and mayor John G. Mullen.

The Gordon House was purchased by Zarko and Bosanka Vucinic, the proprietors of a local tavern and hotel, in 1974 and slated for demolition. The Town of Amherstburg intervened, designating the house under the Ontario Heritage Act in 1976. After more than a decade of legal battles, in 1987 the town agreed to move the house to its current site. Since then, it has served as the headquarters for an unsuccessful project to build a replica of HMS Detroit and as the headquarters of Amherstburg's tourism office.

== Description ==
The Gordon House is located in Amherstburg, Ontario, Canada. Having been moved from 290 Dalhousie Street in 1987, its current address is 266 Dalhousie Street, at the corner of Dalhousie and Murray Street. It backs onto the Navy Yard Park. It is the oldest structure built in Amherstburg, as well as one of only two surviving merchant houses from the 18th-century in the town, the other being the Park House.

The Gordon House is in the Georgian style. Built around a hall, it has a plain, balanced, and symmetrical facade with a central door. The house is framed in timber with brick or stone fill. The original clapboard has been covered in aluminium siding. The steep roof has narrow eaves. The interior of the house consists of several rooms. Towards the rear is a former birthing room. The upper storey included a parlour and bedrooms, which have been transformed into offices, as well as an observation balcony.

== History ==
=== Early history ===
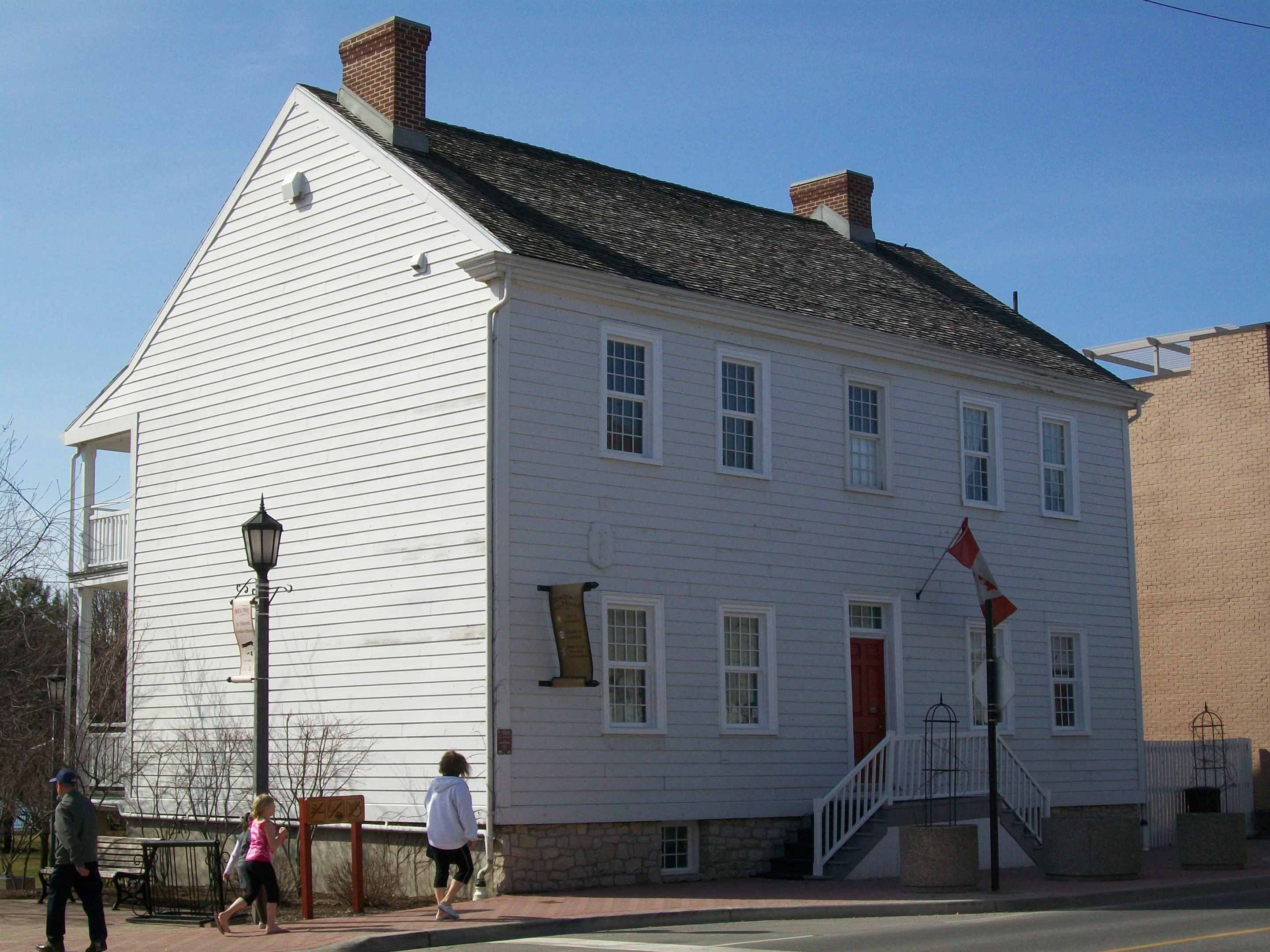
Three-quarter view of the house; the balconies at the rear were added by 1824.

The Gordon House was built in 1798, two years after Amherstburg was founded along the Detroit River, as part of a new merchants' district. A 1987 review of the site by Harry Bosveld and Bob Bondy, employees at nearby Fort Malden, indicated that the original foundation had been laid with local bricks. The lot was first occupied by George Sharp, a clerk, who sold the lot in 1798 to William Mills, a prosperous merchant who operated a ropewalk and supplied lumber to the Commissariat Department. A Loyalist who had relocated to Canada during the American Revolution, Mills occupied the house until the War of 1812, at which time he served as a captain in the First Essex; according to local tradition, he hosted General Isaac Brock at the house. Having been wounded during the Battle of Frenchtown and captured by American forces, Mills died in 1813.

Between 1813 and 1815, Amherstburg was occupied by American forces. The Gordon House was used as a billet, causing damage for which Mills's executor James Gordon sought compensation after the war's conclusion. Gordon purchased the house from Mills's brother in 1817. Based on contemporary paintings, Gordon appears to have added large porches by 1824, at which time he was serving as a member of parliament. Bosveld and Body concluded that new eavestroughs were installed around this time. Gordon continued to occupy the house until 1851, at which time he sold it to his brother Lewis. The house remained with the Gordon family until 1877.

In 1886, the house was purchased by the wealthy coal merchant John G. Mullen and his wife Isabella. The Mullens were recognized philanthropists, as well as community leaders—John Mullen went on to serve as mayor—and they maintained open doors. In a 1900 visit, Prime Minister Sir Wilfrid Laurier and his party dined with the Mullens at the house. The family remained for six decades. Later owners included the Kennedys, Korgemets, and Kollins.

=== Designation and lawsuit ===
The Gordon House was purchased by Zarko and Bosanka Vucinic in 1974. The proprietors of the Duffy Tavern and a 17-unit motel, the Vucinics had purchased several nearby properties; this included the Park House, purchased in 1971, which was slated for demolition until it was moved by the local Rotary Club. The Vucinics intended to expand their property further, adding another eighteen rooms. In 1975, the Town of Amherstburg began the process of designating the Gordon House under the Ontario Heritage Act. The Vucinics filed a complaint, which resulted in a review by the Ontario Conservation Review Board.

Following the board's recommendation, the Gordon House was designated on June 28, 1976, through By-Law No. 1421. In October 1980 and January 1981, Zarko Vucinic petitioned for the house's demolition. The municipal government refused, while Vucinic rejected the town's recommendation to incorporate the house into the motel. After a lawsuit and expropriation hearings, in 1987 the town government agreed to quash its expropriation proceedings. This ended over a decade of legal proceedings.

The town physically moved the house to 266 Dalhousie Street, leaving behind the foundation, garage, and a small addition. This new site had previously been occupied by the Heritage Inn, which had been destroyed by fire in 1977. The move, handled by the Windsor-based DCL Contracting, cost about CA$236,200 (equivalent to $566,000 in 2025); more than half came through grants from the Community Facilities Improvement Program and the Ontario Heritage Foundation. Several council members indicated that they would have opposed saving the house had these grants not been received. By-Law No. 1421 was repealed in 1987, removing designated status, which was restored the following March through By-Law No. 2013. In 1989, Vucinic sued the town of Amherstburg, seeking CA$2.3 million (equivalent to $5,050,000 in 2025) in compensation for his legal fees and the losses he incurred; he received CA$595,137 (equivalent to $1,070,000 in 2025), including interest, in 1998.

=== Subsequent history ===
Left vacant for over a decade, the Gordon House became increasingly dilapidated, though the town had hopes to maintain it. Speaking to The Windsor Star in 1989, Mayor William Gibb described the house as a potential stop on a walking tour of Amherstburg's history, which would also include the Park House and the North American Black Historical Museum (now the Amherstburg Freedom Museum).

In 1996, the Gordon House underwent renovations, which aimed to restore the house to its 1817 state with modern amenities such as electricity and telephone wiring. Undertaken under the supervision of Patrick Coles, the project brought the building down to its frame, then rebuilt it based on early depictions. Colours were matched based on surviving paint and wall decorations, while other elements were based on Gordon's 1813 reparations claim. New windows were installed to allow view of the interior brickwork, and furnishings—including silver teapots and mahogany sideboards—were donated by community members. Renovations cost CA$560,000 (equivalent to $1,044,000 in 2025), with most funds coming from the federal and provincial governments; some CA$187,000 (equivalent to $345,000 in 2025) was borne by the Town of Amherstburg.

After an official opening ceremony in April 1996, the Gordon House reopened to the public on August 1. Additions included a gift shop and a tea room. The house served as the headquarters of the H.M.S. Detroit project, established in 1982 to build a replica of the 1813 ship of the same name, from the 1990s through the 2000s; the project concluded before the ship could be rebuilt, and its hull was sold to an American group. Other occupants included the Amherstburg Chamber of Commerce and the Erie Shores International Wine Festival. As of 2022, the Gordon House serves as the Amherstburg tourism offices.

== Works cited ==
- "County in Brief: Restored Gordon House Opens—but not to Public". The Windsor Star. April 29, 1996. p. B1 – via ProQuest.
- Crane, Mark (January 19, 1996). "Gordon House Walls Reveal History". The Windsor Star. p. B3 – via ProQuest.
- Cruickshank, Tom (2009). Old Ontario Houses: Traditions in Local Architecture. Buffalo, New York: Firefly Books. ISBN 978-1-55407-504-1.
- Daniszewski, Hank (March 19, 1987). "Deal for Gordon House Opens Door on Town Park". The Windsor Star. p. A5 – via ProQuest.
- "History Town's Greatest Strength". The Windsor Star. May 25, 1989. p. C8 – via ProQuest.
- "HMS Detroit Group Back at Gordon House". The Windsor Star. July 13, 2006. p. A5 – via ProQuest.
- Honywill, Brad (October 10, 1987). "Historians Chip Away the Years". The Windsor Star. p. A5 – via ProQuest.
- Honywill, Brad (December 24, 1988). "Project HMS Detroit Finally Back on Course". The Windsor Star. p. C4 – via ProQuest.
- Honywill, Brad (March 30, 1989). "Amherstburg Rebuffs Gordon House Claim". The Windsor Star. p. A5 – via ProQuest.
- Jarvis, Anne (July 10, 2009). "A Sorry History of Neglect". The Windsor Star. p. A3 – via ProQuest.
- "In Amherstburg 200 and Counting". The Windsor Star. January 8, 1996. p. A6 – via ProQuest.
- Janzer, Stacey (October 31, 2022). "The Haunting of Amherstburg's Gordon House". CBC. Archived from the original on May 12, 2026.
- "Payment to End 20-Year Legal Battle". The Windsor Star. February 10, 1998. p. A5 – via ProQuest.
- Reiner, Meg (2022). Heritage Building Amherstburg. Windsor, Ontario: Walkerville Publishing. ISBN 978-1-927591-30-7.
- Sinkevitch, Chuck (August 26, 1996). "Gordon House: Project a Source of Pride". The Windsor Star. p. B3 – via ProQuest.
- Smrke, Jacqueline (June 28, 1997). "Amherstburg Welcomes Its New Look". The Windsor Star. p. A3 – via ProQuest.
- Town of Amherstburg (November 23, 1987). "By-Law No. 1994". Ontario Heritage Trust. Archived from the original on May 12, 2026.
- Town of Amherstburg (March 14, 1988). "By-Law No. 2013". Ontario Heritage Trust. Archived from the original on May 12, 2026.
- "Municipally Designated Heritage Properties". Town of Amherstburg. Archived from the original on May 11, 2026.
- "Unanimous Vote Saves Old House". The Windsor Star. August 10, 1987. p. A5 – via ProQuest.
