= James Gordon (Upper Canada politician) =

Canadian politician

James Gordon (August 26, 1786 – April 10, 1865) was a merchant and political figure in Upper Canada and Canada West.

He was born in Inverness, Scotland in 1786 and studied at the Inverness Royal Academy. He came to Amherstburg in Upper Canada. He served in the local militia, becoming lieutenant in 1809 and lieutenant colonel in 1822. He represented Kent in the Legislative Assembly of Upper Canada from 1820 to 1828. In 1822, he was named justice of the peace in the Western District. He was appointed to the Legislative Council of Upper Canada in 1829 and to the Legislative Council of the Province of Canada in 1845.

He died in Toronto in 1865.

Gordon's former home, now known as the Gordon House, was designated under the Ontario Heritage Act in 1976 and 1988.
