= Christ Church, Amherstburg =

Church in Ontario, Canada

Christ Church
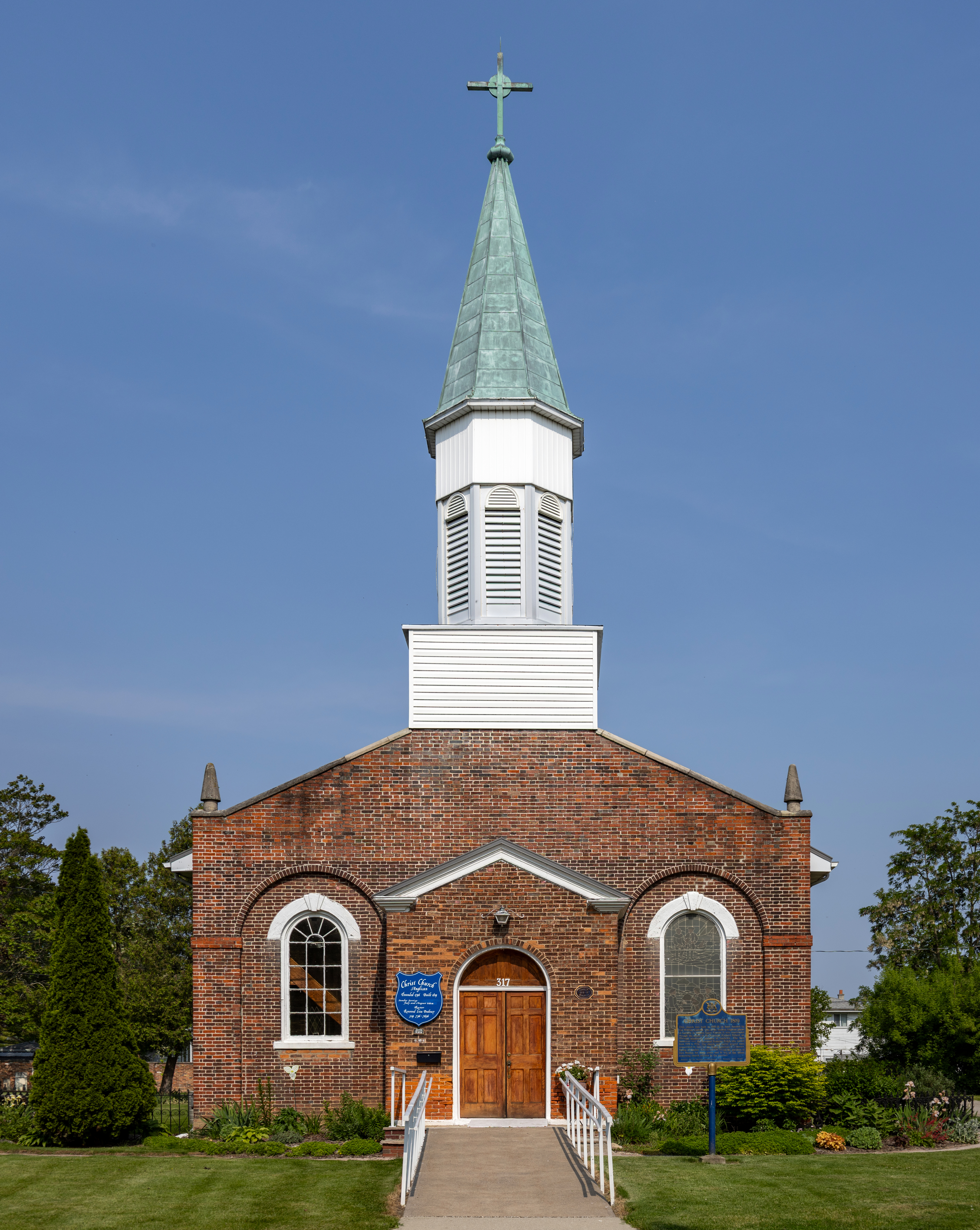
- Christ Church
- 42.1000°N 83.1104°W
- Address: 317 Ramsay St., Amherstburg, Ontario
- Country: Canada
- Denomination: Anglican Church of Canada

Architecture
- Style: Neoclassical
- Groundbreaking: 1818
- Completed: 1819

Administration
- Province: Ontario
- Diocese: Huron

Clergy
- Rector: Lisa Poultney

Christ Church is an Anglican Church of Canada church in Amherstburg, Ontario. Built between 1818 and 1819, it served the garrison at Fort Malden as well as the local civilian population. It is the oldest extant Anglican church in Essex County, and was designated historically significant by the Ontario Heritage Trust in 1983.

== Location and description ==
Christ Church is located at 317 Ramsay Street in Amherstburg, Ontario, on the southern boundary of the downtown core.

The one-storey church is built in a Neoclassical style. The exterior of the church uses red brick in Flemish bond, with round-headed wooden double doors and Georgian windows on the façade and body. The chancel, constructed in 1875, uses lancet windows. The church is topped by a copper spire, with a cross at its peak. At the front of the church is a porch, installed in 1853, and above the eaves are two finials. The grounds contain two plaques installed by the provincial government, one detailing the history of the church and the other providing a brief biography of William Caldwell.

The interior of the church features oak pews, including one marked for Caldwell. These pews, which replaced ones of black walnut, are divided by a centre aisle. The church also features a choir loft and space for an organ. The open frame ceiling includes oak pins and iron bands, with the timbers "constructed as an upside down ship's hull in Norse fashion".

== History ==
Planning for Christ Church began after the War of 1812, during which the existing Indian Council House was destroyed. William Caldwell, a Loyalist who had led Butler's Rangers and served with the British Indian Department, donated 1 acre (0.40 ha) of land and 100 guineas toward the project in return for a dedicated pew. Further funding came from the British government of Upper Canada, on the condition that soldiers stationed at nearby Fort Malden would be allowed to worship at the church. Planning came from Chaplain Richard Pollard, with Christ Church being one of four churches he developed in Essex County for the Society for the Propagation of the Gospel; the others were St. John's Church in Sandwich (1820), St. Paul's Church in Chatham (1820), and Christ Church in Colchester (1821).

Construction of Christ Church began in 1818 and finished the following year. Part of the construction was handled by the Royal Engineers. The first Eucharist was presided by Pollard and Rev. Romaine Rolph on 12 December 1819; Rolph served as incumbent through 1836. In 1833, Rt. Rev. Charles Stewart, the Bishop of Quebec, consecrated the church. In addition to the local civilian population, the church served the garrison at Fort Malden during its first years of existence.

In the late 19th century, the original spire was replaced with an octagonal design, which was in turn replaced in 1935 with the current square-based spire. A 6-metre (20 ft) chancel was added in 1875 to accommodate a choir and organ; another addition was made in 1953 to allow space for a memorial to parishioners killed in World War II.

In 1978, the town of Amherstburg designated Christ Church through By-Law 1511. The church was granted further protection when it was designated by the Ontario Heritage Trust on 26 July 1983. As a result of this designation, the exterior of the church and some internal elements are protected by a conservation easement. In 2019, Christ Church celebrated its two hundredth anniversary with an Epiphany celebration. As of 2025, Christ Church is led by rector Rev. Lisa Poultney and holds worship twice weekly. It is the oldest extant Anglican church in Essex County.

== Works cited ==
- "Christ Church Amherstburg (Anglican)". Historic Places. Parks Canada. Archived from the original on 13 October 2024.
- "Christ Church, Amherstburg". Diocese of Huron. Archived from the original on 26 April 2025.
- Menard, Sandra; Hall, Terry (21 January 2019). "Christ Church, Amherstburg: Two Hundred Years of Continuous Service". Diocese of Huron. Archived from the original on 20 April 2025.
- Perkins, Mary Ellen (1989). Discover Your Heritage: A Guide to Provincial Plaques in Ontario. Dundurn. ISBN 978-0-920474-50-1.
