= Park House Museum =

Coordinates: 42.103682°N 83.113453°W

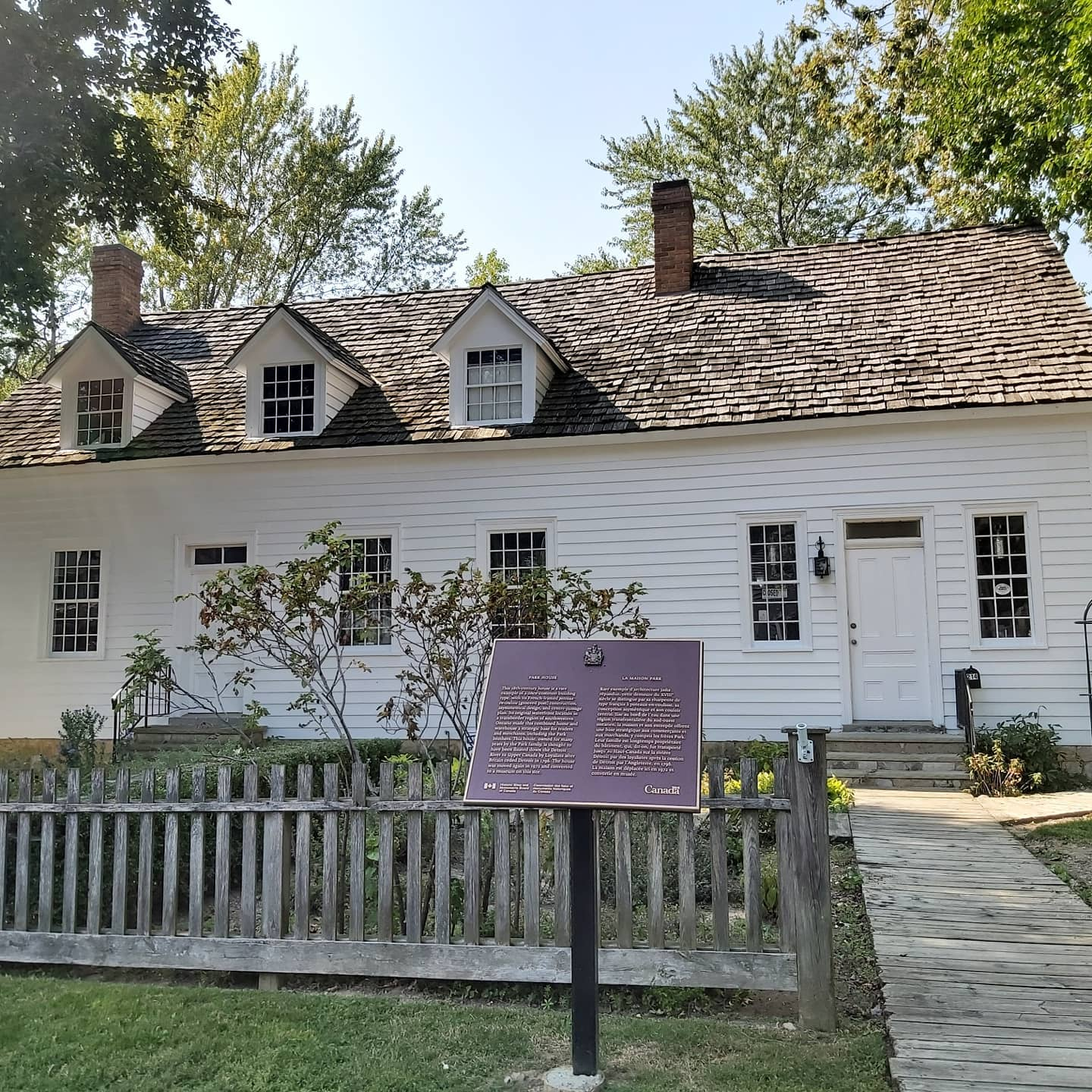
- Front entrance to museum
- Established: 1972
- Location: Amherstburg, Ontario, Canada,
- Type: historic house museum
- Website: www.parkhousemuseum.com/

Park House is a historic house museum, located in Amherstburg, Ontario, Canada. It was built in 1796 in Detroit, but moved to Amherstburg in 1799. It has had many owners, the best-known being the Park family who owned it 102 years. In 1972 it was purchased by the Rotary Club of Amherstburg, becoming a local history museum and being renovated to portray life in the 1850s.

== History ==
Park House was constructed in Detroit near the Rouge River in 1796 by a British loyalist. After the American Revolution the owner moved to Malden, the new British fort across the river. Disassembled and moved by canoe in 1798, the house was rebuilt in Amherstburg on Lot 17, First Street (presently Dalhousie Street), where it stood for 173 years. The first image of Park House Museum is in the painting A View of Amherstburg, 1813 by Margaret Reynolds.

The lots on First Street were awarded through a draw. Lot 17 was first given to a mercantile firm, Leith, Shepherd and Duff. The Commanding officer of Fort Malden, Captain Hector McLean, decided to give it to the schooner Nancy instead. Thus it was held by her owners: her Captain, William Mills, and the Montreal firm Forsyth, Richardson and Company.

Alexander Mackintosh bought the property in 1817. However, Mackintosh only held the house until 1823, when Jean Baptiste Macon purchased it. Macon was a well-known merchant in Amherstburg when he bought the property, venturing into his own forwarding business. He hired as clerks the Park brothers, the later namesakes of the house.

Thomas F. Park purchased the house on September 23, 1839. Thomas lent the property to his youngest brother Theodore Jones Park who ran a general merchandising and forwarding business with his brother John R. Park. Theodore bought the house in 1866, two years after his brother Thomas died.

Theodore's son, Dr. Theodore James Park, owned the house next. In 1880 he used the house as the town’s medical office. His sister Lizzie Park gained the house after his death. Having no relatives, she gave the property to Helen Donovan, Spinster of New York State upon her death in 1941. Donovan gave the land to Geraldine S. Sterns from Detroit that same year. Sterns then sold the property to the Lalondes in 1945. The Lalondes created an antique store named Park House Antiques. This store lasted 25 years before they sold the property to Zarko and Bessie Vucinic, the owners of Duffy's Tavern.

The Vucinics wanted to expand their business to the riverfront. They approached Greenfield Village in Dearborn, Michigan to preserve Park House. Hazen Price, the head of a committee of the Amherstburg Rotary Club suggested buying Park House and preserving it so it would need not be moved or demolished. The club approved this and the house was moved to Waterworks Park (presently Amherstburg Navy Yard) where Park House Museum still stands. In July 1973, Amherstburg Historical Sites Association was created to furnish and maintain the museum. After more than a year of restoring and furnishing the house to portray the time of the Park family and businesses, the Museum officially opened December 9, 1973 with a ribbon cutting ceremony attended by Mayor H. Murray Smith.

The Park House Tinsmiths, a volunteer association created in 1978, makes reproduction tinware to help finance the Museum. Although displayed as far as the United Kingdom and sold to places like Fort Malden and Fort George, it could not sustain the Museum. On February 19, 2006 a $46,000 grant given by the Ontario Trillium Foundation, resulted in a grand re-opening.

The museum now educates the public, including school children from Ontario, Michigan, Ohio, and Illinois using such resources as a hand press donated by the Amherstburg Echo, used to print its first edition in 1874. It displays an early French framed, log-styled home with an original 1850s fireplace. The museum currently features displays of 1850s daily life, while the second floor houses exhibits of pioneer and recent artifacts.

The Park House was named a National Historic Site by the federal government on October 4, 2018.
