= Essex Region Conservation Authority =

Conservation authority in Ontario, Canada

- Abbreviation: ERCA
- Established: 1973; 53 years ago
- Headquarters: Windsor, Ontario
- Location: Canada
- Region served: Essex County, Ontario

The Essex Region Conservation Authority (ERCA) is a public-sector agency with delegated provincial authority to address risks of natural hazards, relating to flooding and erosion.

ERCA was established in 1973 to manage the natural resources of the Essex Region in partnership with its member municipalities and the Province of Ontario. The organization's nine member municipalities include the City of Windsor, and the Township of Pelee Island.

ERCA maintains the following 19 parks and recreation areas:

- Andrew Murray O'Neill Memorial Woods (woods and trail along former Leamington-Comber rail line)
- Amherstburg-Essex Greenway
- Hillman Marsh Conservation Area
- Holiday Beach Conservation Area
- John R. Park Homestead Conservation Area
- Chrysler Canada Greenway
- Stone Road Alvar (Pelee, Ontario)
- Cedar Creek Conservation Area
- Cedar Beach Conservation Area
- Kopegaron Woods Conservation Area
- Devonwood Conservation Area
- Maidstone Conservation Area
- McAuliffe Woods Conservation Area
- Ruscom Shores Conservation Area
- Tremblay Beach Conservation Area
- Big Creek Conservation Area
- White Sands Conservation Area
- Crystal Bay Conservation Area
- River Canard Canard Valley Conservation Area
- Kingsville Train Station
- Cypher Systems Group Greenway

== See also ==
- Conservation authority
