= Amherstburg Royal Naval Dockyard =

Shipyard in Ontario, Canada

Coordinates: 42.1015°N 83.1136°W

- Amherstburg, Ontario
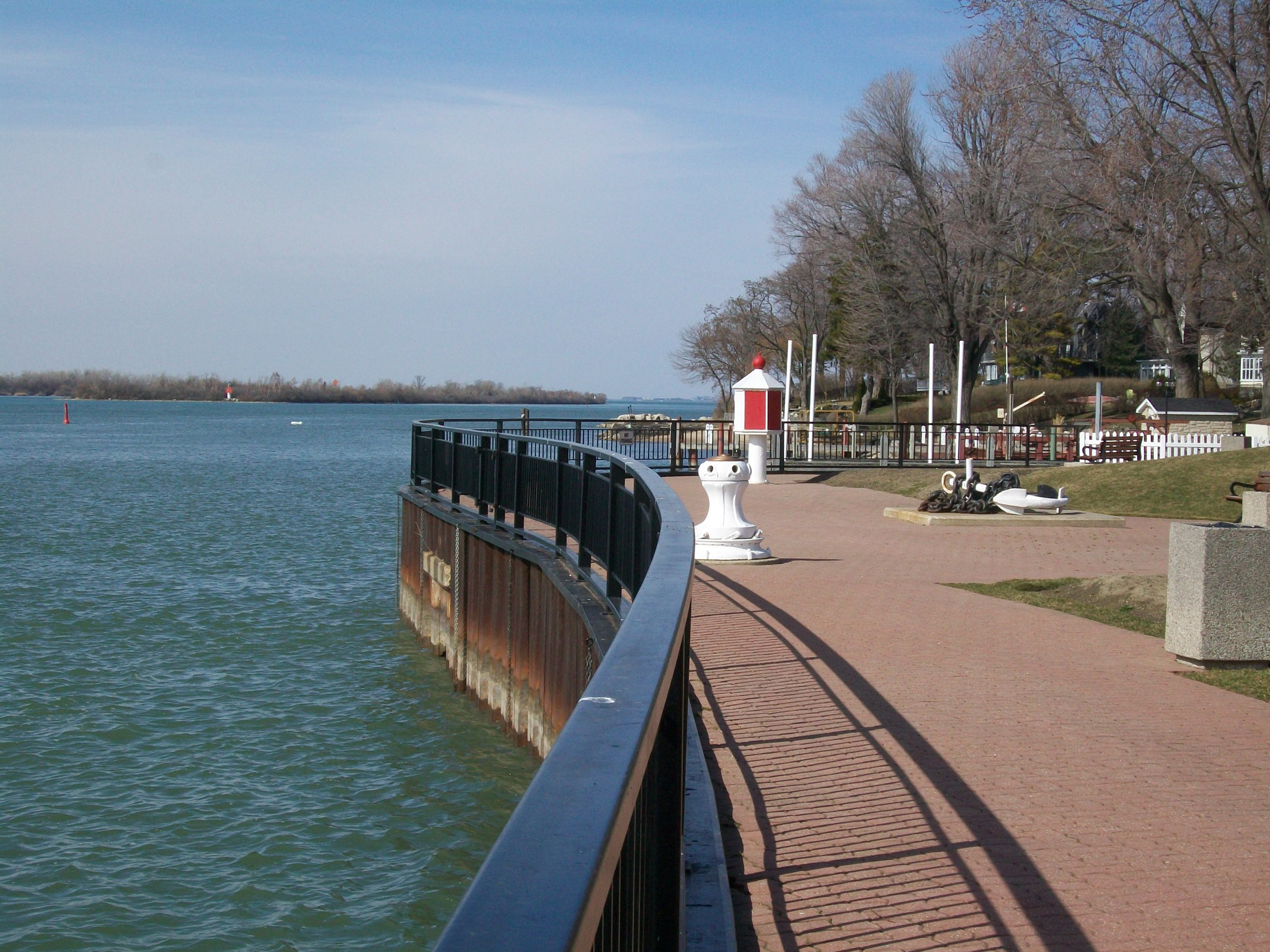
- Site of the Dockyard at Navy Yard Park, Amherstburg

Site information
- Type: Shipyard, dockyard
- Controlled by: Provincial Marine/Royal Navy
- Website: Amherstburg Navy Yard National Historic Site of Canada

Site history
- Built: 1796
- In use: 1796–1813
- Battles/wars: War of 1812

Garrison information
- Garrison: Provincial Marine/Royal Navy

National Historic Site of Canada
- Designated: 1928

Amherstburg Royal Naval Dockyard was a Provincial Marine and then a Royal Navy yard from 1796 to 1813 located at Fort Amherstburg, Upper Canada, (now Amherstburg, Ontario) situated on the Detroit River. The yard comprised blockhouses, storehouses, magazine, wood yard and wharf. The yard was established in 1796 to support the Upper Canada Provincial Marine after Great Britain ceded a pre-existing shipyard on the Detroit River to the United States. Amherstburg Royal Naval Dockyard constructed four warships for the Lake Erie detachment of the Provincial Marine before and during the War of 1812. In 1813 the dockyard was abandoned and destroyed when the British retreated and never reopened. In 1928, the site was designated a National Historic Site of Canada.

== History ==
In 1796, Fort Amherstburg was chosen as the site of a new dockyard for the construction of Provincial Marine vessels after the former site at Detroit was ceded to the United States. It was the only British naval base west of Kingston and located on the Detroit River, with easy access to Lake Erie and Lake Huron. The dockyard comprised a large storehouse, two blockhouses, a timber yard with a saw pit, and a wharf. The blockhouses flanked the yard, with Fort Amherstburg and the town of Amherstburg on either side, with the dockyard overlooking the channel which ran between it and Bois Blanc Island. The dockyard was further protected by defences constructed on the island which watched over the entrances to both ends of the channel. The establishment of the dockyard was directly linked with the growth of the town of Amherstburg, with many inhabitants working at the dockyard.

=== List of ships constructed at yard ===
- General Hope – schooner
- Earl of Camden – schooner
- HMS Caledonia – brig 1807
- HMS General Hunter – brig 1809
- HMS Queen Charlotte – 1810 ship-sloop
- HMS Lady Prevost – schooner 1812
- 2nd HMS Detroit – 1813 ship-sloop

=== War of 1812 ===
During the War of 1812, the yard was the base of operations for first the Provincial Marine's operations on Lake Erie and Lake Huron and later the Royal Navy's. However, due to the yard's location at the far end of Lake Erie, supplies for the yard had to be shipped across the lake from Fort George and overland from Niagara Falls or shipped to York and Burlington Heights, transported overland to Long Point before being transported on the lake again to the shipyard. In May 1813, the Royal Navy took command of all Provincial Marine forces and establishments on Lake Erie. With the construction of superior American ships in 1813, Commander Robert Heriot Barclay, the Royal Navy commander of the Lake Erie squadron in 1813, sought to defeat the Americans before they could cut off his supply lines. The Battle of Lake Erie, saw the effort fail and the entire British squadron was captured. With the American control of the lake, the British land forces were forced to retreat to Burlington Heights in order to be supplied. The yard was burned and abandoned in September 1813 after the Battle of Lake Erie. In 1814 a new yard was established at Penetanguishene Naval Yard.

== National historic site ==
The site of the yard was designated a National Historic Site of Canada in 1928. The site is marked by a four-sided monument featuring four brass plaques detailing the site's historic significance, located in a 4.25-hectare (10.5-acre) municipal park.

== See also ==
- George Benson Hall
