= Cypher Systems Group Greenway =

Rail trail in Ontario, Canada

Coordinates: 42°10′02.6″N 82°51′36.7″W

- Length: 23.9 km (14.9 mi)
- Location: Amherstburg to Essex; Ontario; Canada
- Established: 2007
- Waymark
- Right of way: rail trail

The Cypher Systems Group Greenway (formerly Amherstburg–Essex Greenway) is a 23.9-kilometre (14.9 mi) rail trail along a former CN Rail spur line in the town of Essex, Ontario, Canada. As of May 2013, the trail extends from Sadler's Park in Essex towards Amherstburg. CN Rail had donated this spur line in 1997, following the donation of its other subdivision, which is now the Chrysler Canada Greenway, in 1993, to ERCA, which manages the trail. The total distance of the former rail line is 28 kilometres (17 mi), and extends via McGregor to Amherstburg. ERCA has stated they intended on linking to the Chrysler Canada Greenway and Amherstburg when funds become available, which was finally realized in the summer of 2017.
