= John R. Park Homestead Conservation Area =

Coordinates: 41°59′43.31″N 82°50′56.54″W

John R. Park Homestead Conservation Area is the original home of John and Amelia (Gamble) Park. It is now an agricultural and living history museum of farm life in the 19th century in present-day Essex, Ontario.

== Historic property ==
The property is designated an Ontario Heritage Trust. It is owned and operated by the Essex Region Conservation Authority.

In the 1820s and 1830s, brothers John Richardson, Theodore, and Thomas Park migrated from Massachusetts to Upper Canada. In 1833, they purchased a 114-acre lot on Lake Erie. They were owners of a sawmill, general store, and a Great Lakes shipping line. They were also large land holders. John was a co-founder of the Colchester Agricultural Society and he was a treasurer and councillor for Colchester Township. Two generations of the Fox family, United Empire Loyalists and prominent citizens, owned the property after the Parks.

The two-story Greek Revival clapboard house, built in 1842, sits on farmland with an heirloom orchard. Eleven contributing barns and outbuildings include those built between 1850 and 1882: blacksmith shop, horse barn, hog barn, calf barn, and corn crib barn. Built between 1975 and 1985 are the sawmill, the lee house, smoke house, utility shed, outhouse, and the curatorial building. The 5.917–hectares property has 350 metres of frontage on Lake Erie, which is its southern border. Its northern border is County Road 50 and on the east is Fox Creek.

In 1978, the property became a living history museum, the only one west of London in Ontario. It is operated by the Essex Region Conservation Authority.

In 2020, the Canadian Experiences Fund provided a $600,000 (~$695,968 in 2023) grant, to be matched by donations from the conservation authority. The $1.2-million Heritage Centre will provide a "creative commons", an outdoor classroom, and more exhibit space.

Honey Locust, Black Walnut, and Silver Maples are among the heritage trees on the property. Fox Creek is a Provincially Significant Wetland (PSW).

== Underground Railroad ==
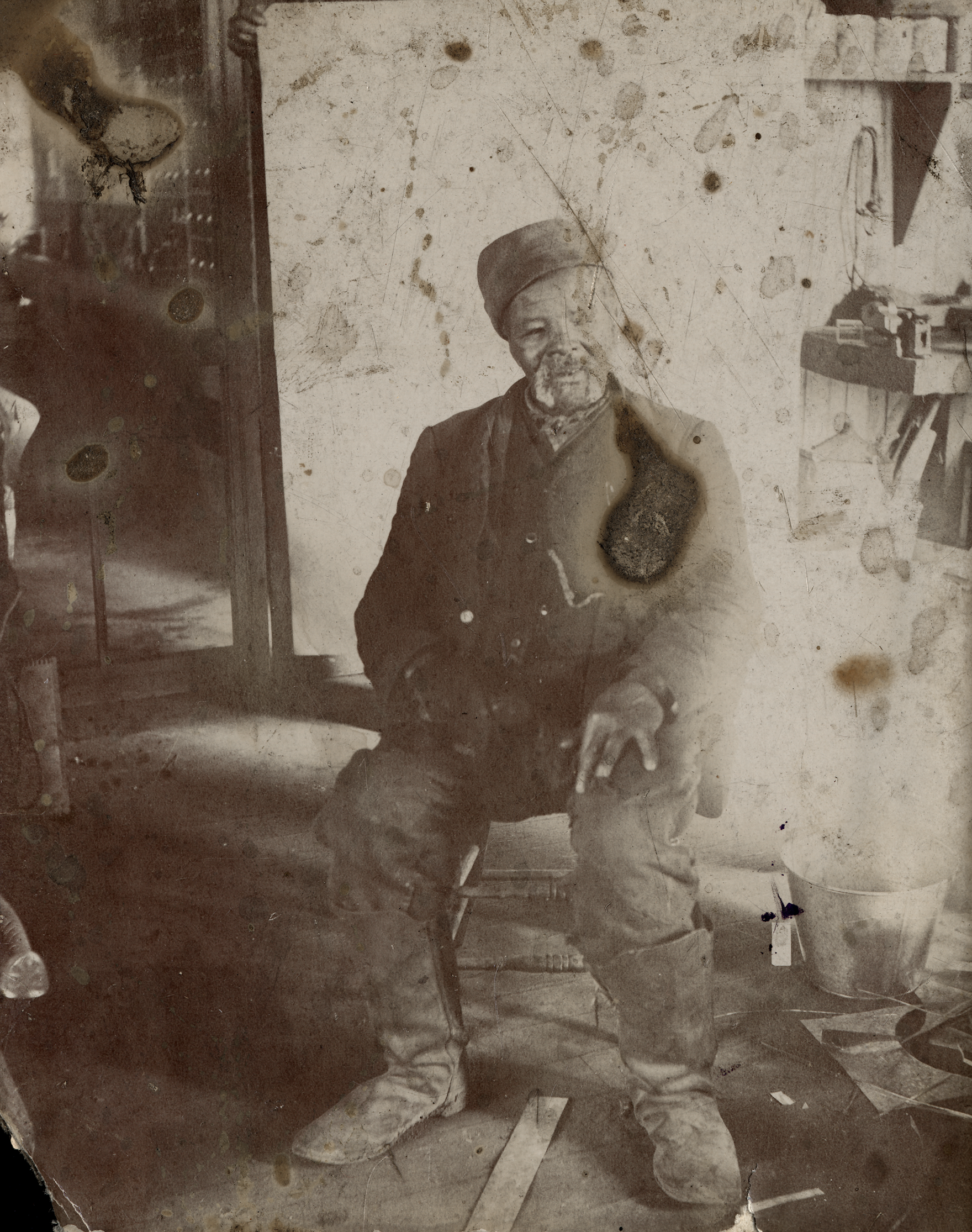
Levi Veney, ex-slave who lived in Amherstburg, Ontario. Taken at J. D. Burkes’ general store, [ca. 1898]

After crossing the border between the United States and Canada, the Park House in Amherstburg offered protection and shelter upon entering Upper Canada, now Ontario. One of the freedom seekers who came through the Park House in Amherstburg was a former enslaved man, Levi Veney.
