= Amherstburg Freedom Museum =

Nonprofit museum in Ontario, Canada

- Established: 1975
- Location: 277 King St. Amherstburg, Ontario, Canada
- Coordinates: 42.101296°N 83.105705°W
- Type: National Historic Site
- Website: www.amherstburgfreedom.org

National Historic Site of Canada
- Official name: Nazrey African Methodist Episcopal Church
- Designated: 1998

Amherstburg Freedom Museum, previously known as the North American Black Historical Museum, is located in Amherstburg, Ontario, Canada. It is a community-based, non-profit museum that tells the story of African-Canadians' history and contributions. Founded in 1975 by local residents, it preserves and presents artifacts of African-Canadians, many of whose ancestors had entered Canada as refugees from United States slavery. They found it relatively easy to enter Canada from across the Detroit River.

Although Michigan was a free territory and state, many refugee slaves continued to settle in Canada in order to be beyond the reach of the US Fugitive Slave Acts. The Museum complex which houses permanent and temporary exhibits, and consists of the museum building, the Taylor Log Cabin-a historic home from that period, and Nazrey African Methodist Episcopal Church, National Historic Site.

== Founding ==
The museum was founded by Betty and Melvin "Mac" Simpson, a local couple, and officially incorporated in 1975. Their vision was to promote the rich heritage of African Canadians, many of whose ancestors had come as refugees from slavery in the United States. In 2015, the North American Black Historical Museum celebrated its 40th anniversary. It has since changed its name to the Amherstburg Freedom Museum, to emphasize its connection to people seeking freedom.

== Nazrey A.M.E. Church ==
This African Methodist Episcopal church was built by hand of fieldstone by former slaves and free blacks in 1848. They were members of a congregation established in 1826 by African-American refugees. The AME denomination was founded in the United States in the early 19th century by free blacks in Philadelphia, Pennsylvania as the first independent black denomination in that country.

Members aided other refugee slaves from the United States by using it as a stop on the Underground Railroad. It was associated with Bishop Willis Nazery, the first leader of the British Methodist Episcopal Church, a denomination established by Underground Railroad (UGRR). This wholly Canadian denomination was expressive of the refugees' allegiance to their new homeland. The church was designated as a National Historic Site of Canada in December 1998. The building was restored and reopened in 2001 as part of the museum complex.

== Programming ==
Today, visitors from all over the world can tour the Museum, including the Taylor Log Cabin and Nazrey A.M.E. Church, both buildings from the time of the Underground Railroad before the American Civil War. The Museum provides annual cultural events including Black History Month programming, Ribs & Ragtime, the Emancipation Celebration and Charity Golf Classic, and Christmas at the Amherstburg Freedom Museum.

== Affiliations ==
The Museum is affiliated with: CMA, CHIN, and Virtual Museum of Canada.

== See also ==
- List of museums focused on African Americans
- African diaspora
- African-Canadian Heritage Tour
- Slavery in Canada
- Black Canadians
