= Amherstburg =

Town in Ontario, Canada

- Town (lower-tier)
- Town of Amherstburg
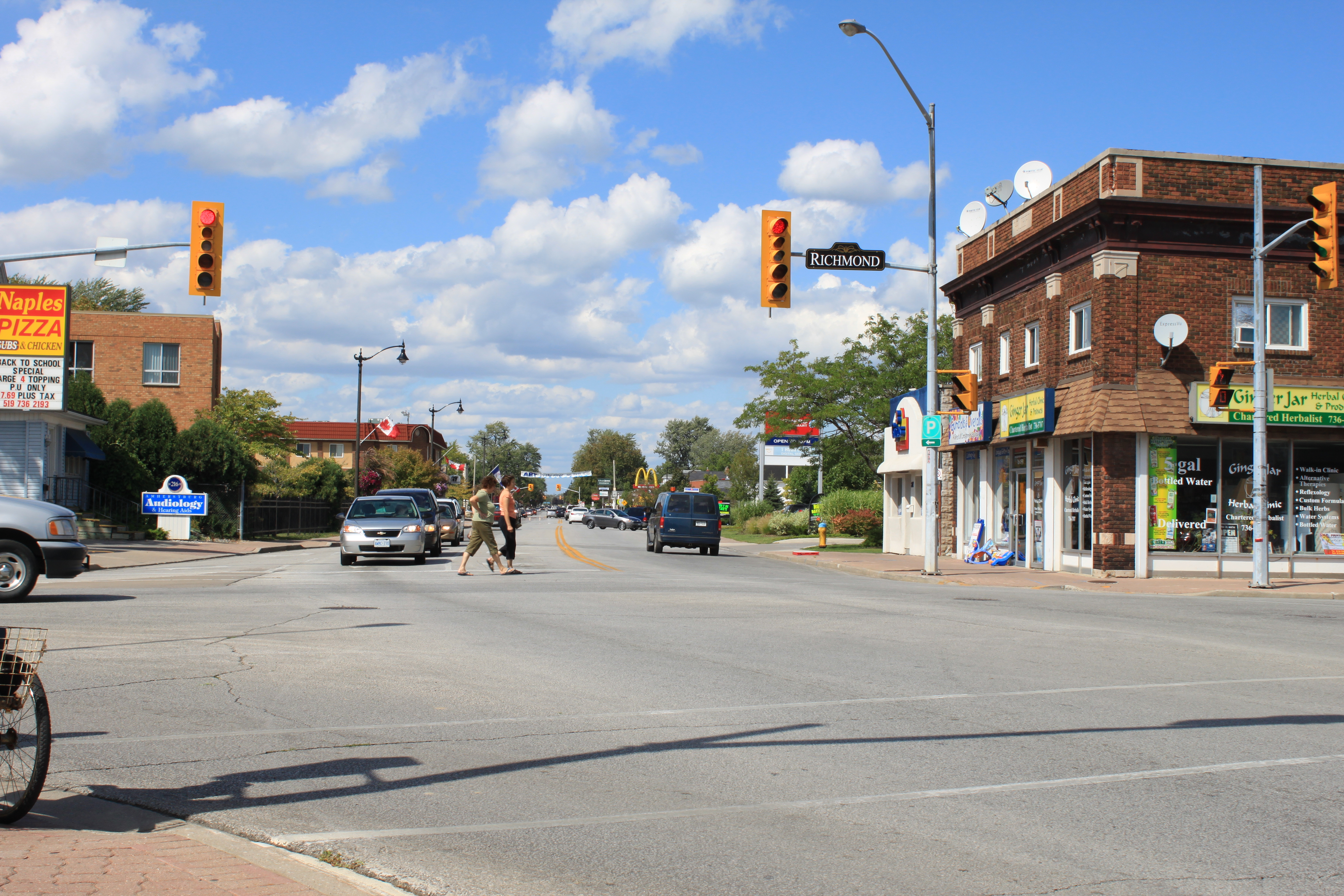
- Sandwich St. at Richmond St

- Flag Seal

- Location within Essex County Location within Southern Ontario
- Coordinates: 42°06′N 83°05′W
- Country: Canada
- Province: Ontario
- County: Essex

Government
  - Mayor: Michael Prue
  - MP: Chris Lewis (Conservative)
  - MPP: Anthony Leardi (PC)

Area
  - Land: 183.76 km^{2} (70.95 sq mi)
  - Urban: 13.70 km^{2} (5.29 sq mi)

Population (2021)
  - Town (lower-tier): 23,524
  - Density: 128/km^{2} (330/sq mi)
  - Urban: 15,177
- Time zone: UTC-5 (Eastern (EST))
  - Summer (DST): UTC-4 (EDT)
- Forward sortation area: N9V
- Area codes: 519 and 226
- Website: www.amherstburg.ca

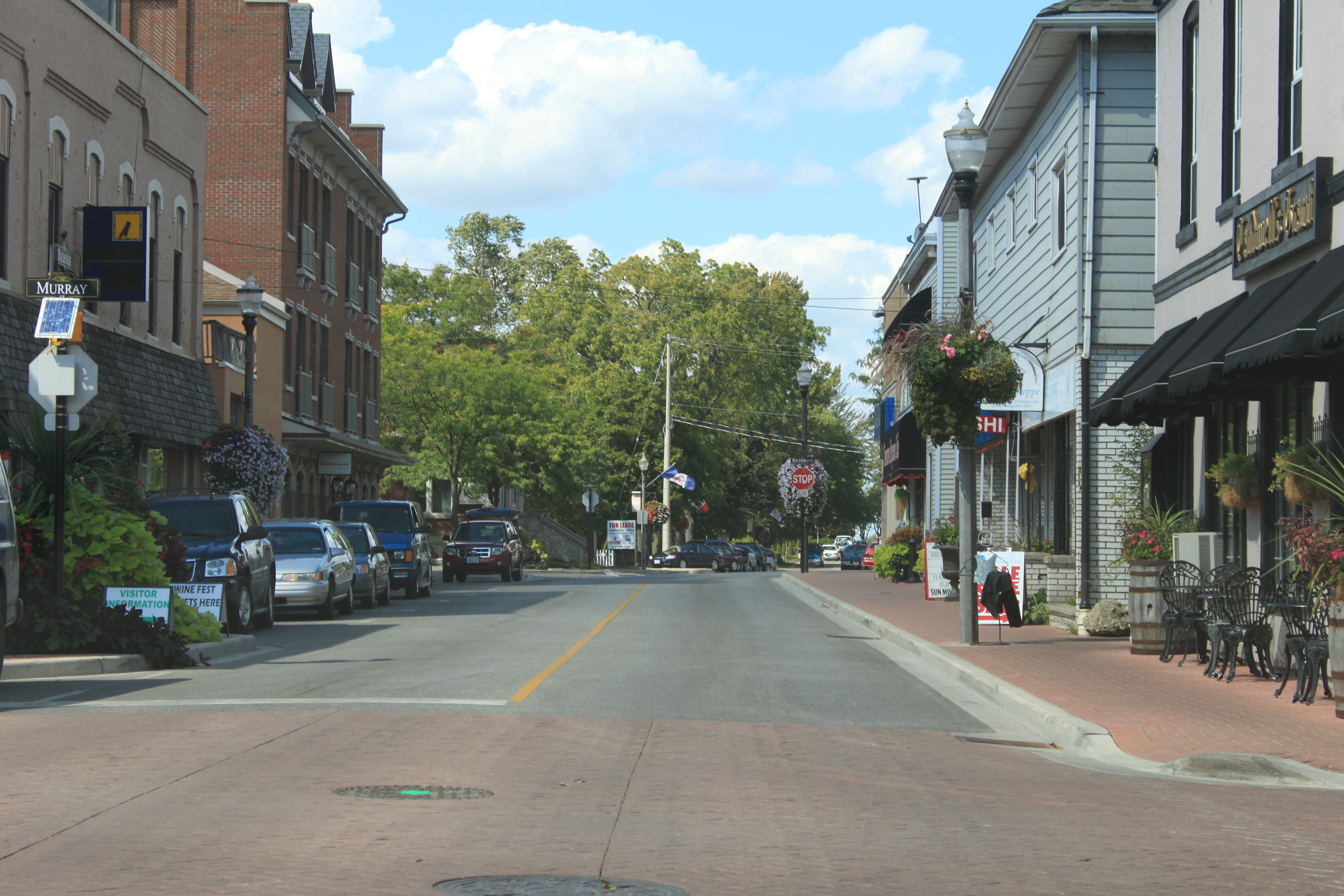
Dalhousie St. between Murray and Richmond Sts.

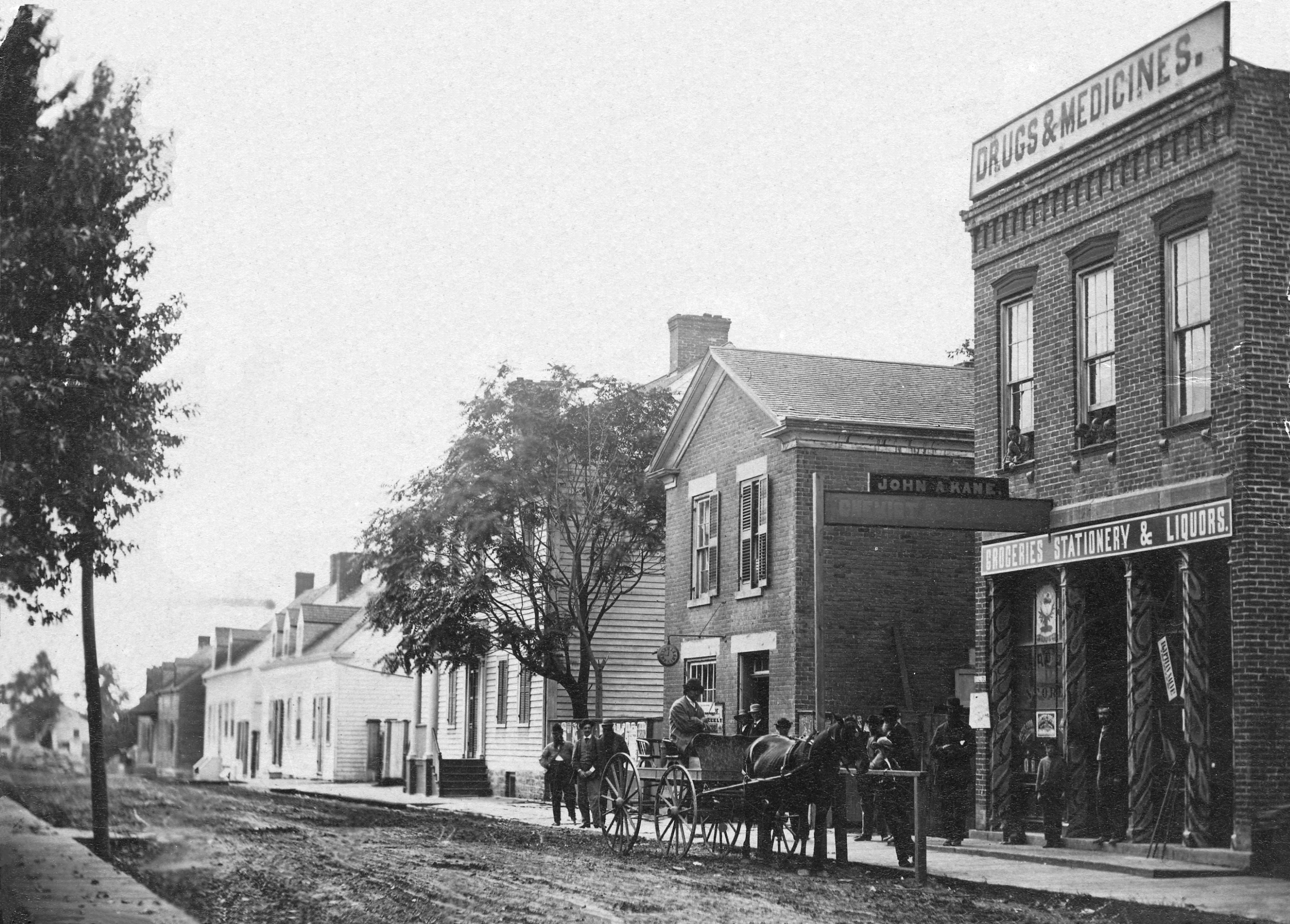
Main Street, Amherstburg, 1865.

Amherstburg is a town near the mouth of the Detroit River in Essex County, Ontario, Canada. In 1796, Fort Malden was established here, stimulating growth in the settlement. The fort has been designated as a National Historic Site.

The town is approximately 25 kilometres (16 mi) south of the U.S. city of Detroit, Michigan, facing Wyandotte, Grosse Ile Township, Brownstown Charter Township, Trenton, and Gibraltar, Michigan. It is part of the Windsor census metropolitan area.

== Communities ==
Besides the town proper of Amherstburg, the town of Amherstburg comprises a number of villages and hamlets, including the following communities:

- Former Anderdon Township: – Edgewater Beach, McGregor (partially), River Canard (partially); Golfview, Kingsbridge, Pointe West; Auld, Delisle's Corners (partially), Loiselleville, Paquette Corners (partially), Rivière-Aux-Canards, Southwick, Splitlog
- Former Malden Township: – Amherstburg, Amherst Point, Bar Point, Busy Bee Corners, Erieview Beach, Glen Eden, Lake Erie Country Club, Lakewood Beach, Malden Centre, McGregor (partially), Sunset Beach, Willow Beach, Willowood; Gordon, North Malden, Quarries; Good Child Beach, Sinasac Corners, The Meadows, Boblo Island

== History ==
French colonists had settled along what became the Canadian side of the Detroit River during the colonial era, establishing small farms. The Petite Côte settlement was founded along the river to the north.

In 1796, after losing the Thirteen Colonies following the American Revolutionary War, the British established Fort Malden as a military fort overlooking the river's mouth at Lake Erie. It was occupied as a garrison. This stimulated development in the area, as did the Crown granting land in Upper Canada to Loyalists (now known as United Empire Loyalists) in compensation for losses in the Thirteen Colonies, or as payment for service in the military during the war.

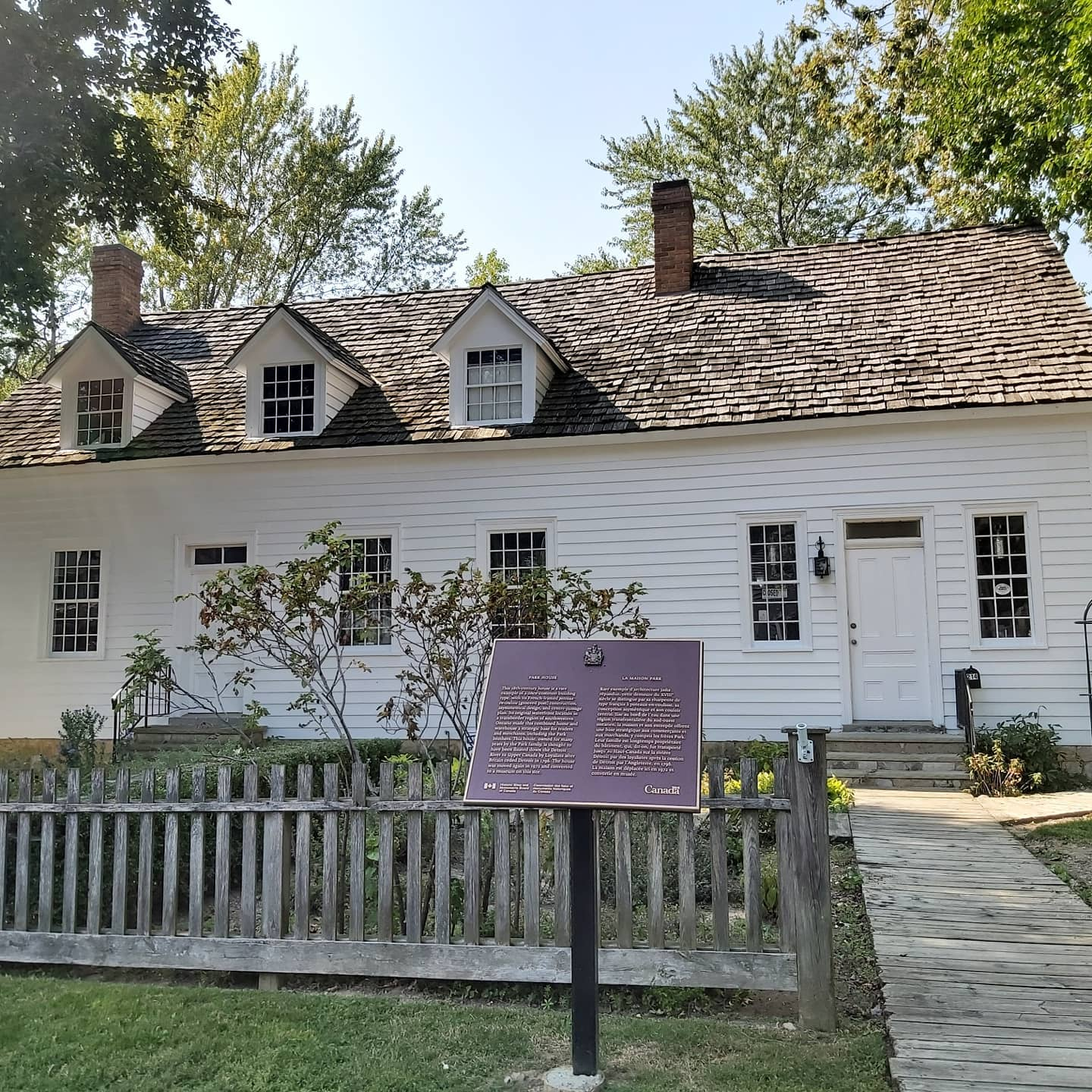
Park House Museum, Amherstburg Ontario, c. 1796

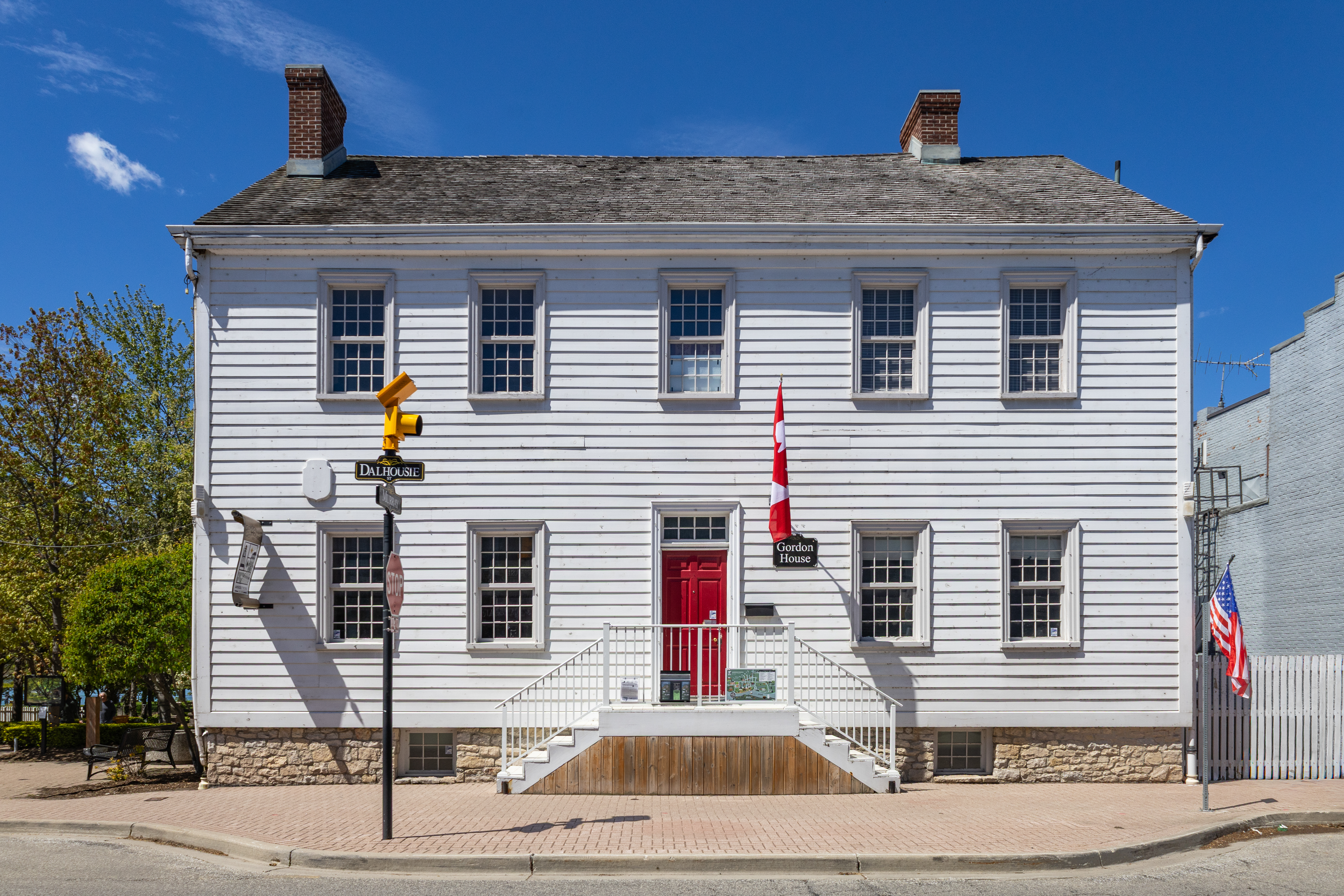
Gordon House, Amherstburg, Ontario, 1798

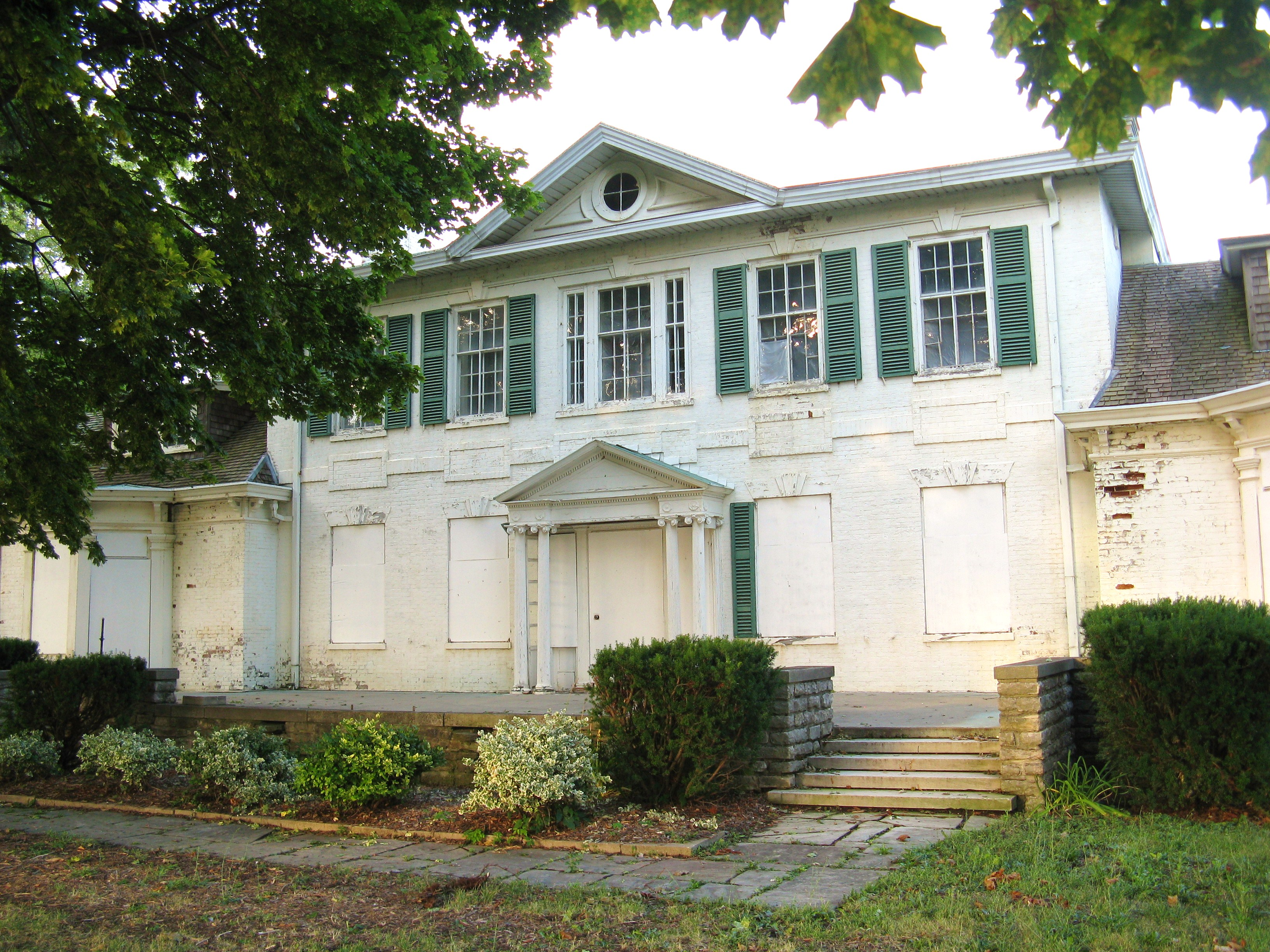
Belle Vue, c. 1816

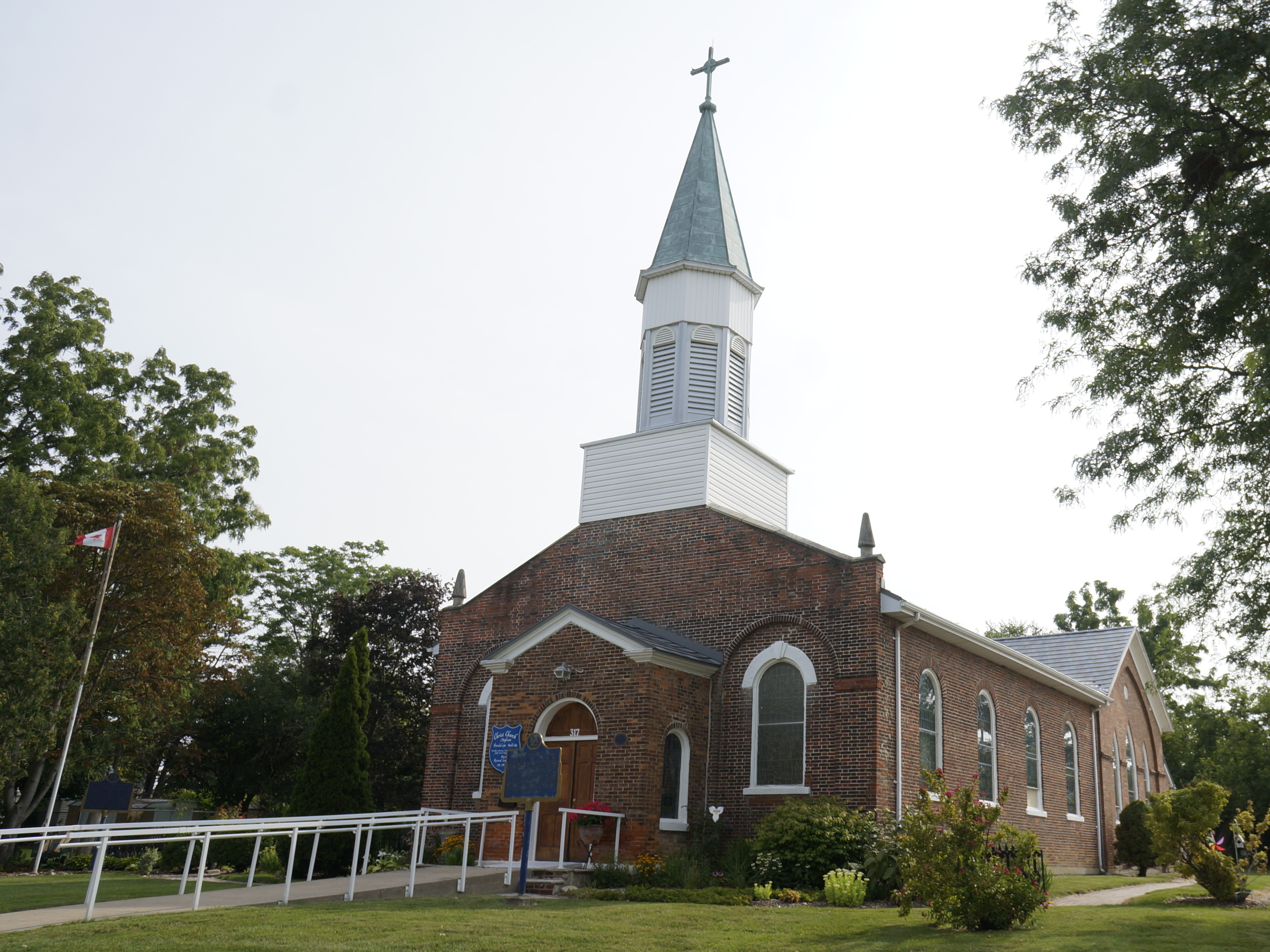
Christ Church, built in 1819

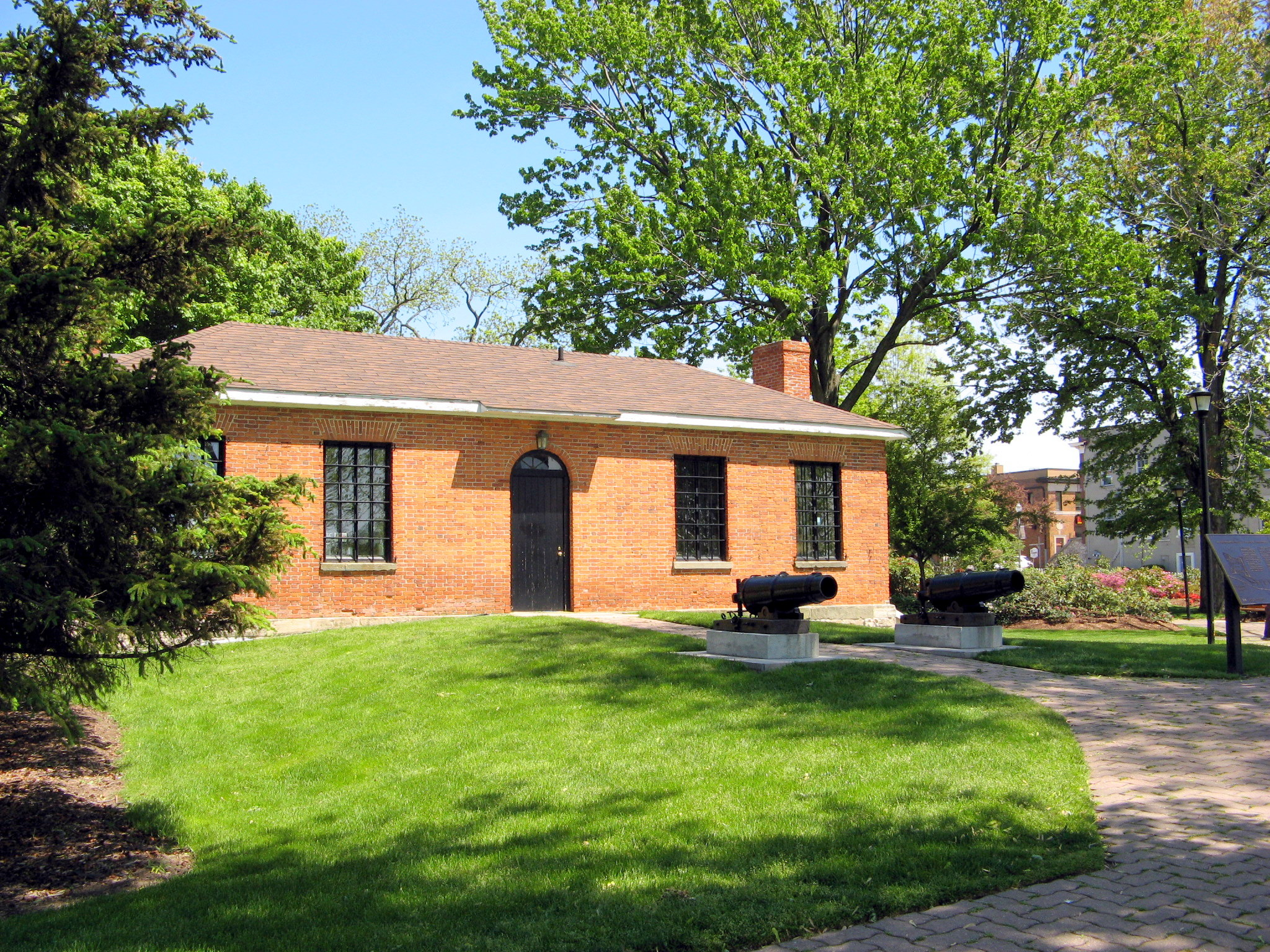
The Commissary Building, built in 1832

The Crown also wanted to increase population and development in Upper Canada. The new settlers built many of their houses in the French style of a century before, giving the new town a historic character. French-speaking colonists also settled here, some of whom were descendants of soldiers and traders associated with Fort Detroit, or other early colonists. They were known as Fort Detroit French, in contrast to later migrants of the 19th century from Quebec, who became known as Canadian French. St. Jean was their Catholic church.

During the days of the Underground Railroad before the American Civil War, refugee African-American slaves often crossed the Detroit river to escape to freedom in Canada, after the Crown abolished slavery. Although Michigan was a free state, slavecatchers went to Detroit trying to capture slaves and take them to owners for bounty. Detroit abolitionists William Lambert and especially George DeBaptiste were key to helping the slaves escape. DeBaptiste owned a lake steamboat that he used to offload refugees in town while docked ostensibly to load lumber. They used Fort Malden as one of several entry points to Canada. The town is mentioned in Uncle Tom’s Cabin as the entry point of George and Eliza, after escaping from slavery in the United States.

By 1869, the town of Amherstburg in the Township of Malden, County of Essex had a population of 2,500. When the fort was no longer needed for military purposes, the government adapted it for use as a provincial "lunatic asylum". Its main building was later used as a Port of Entry, Money Order office, Post Office & savings bank.

Amherstburg was incorporated as a town in 1878. The town is named after Jeffery Amherst, 1st Baron Amherst, commander of the British forces and first British Governor General of the Province of Quebec (1760).

In 1998, The Town of Amherstburg absorbed the neighbouring Township of Anderdon (to its northeast) and Township of Malden (to its southeast) to form a larger Town of Amherstburg.

At 20:01 Eastern Daylight Time on April 19, 2018, a magnitude 3.6 earthquake (with a depth of 7.8 kilometres (4.8 mi)) occurred in Amherstburg, between the main portion of town and McGregor. No damage was reported, but the 30-second shaking was felt in Windsor, Downtown Detroit, and the Downriver communities across the river, such as Grosse Ile, Michigan. Some minor shaking was felt as far away as Toledo, Ohio along Lake Erie and Ann Arbor in the interior of Michigan.

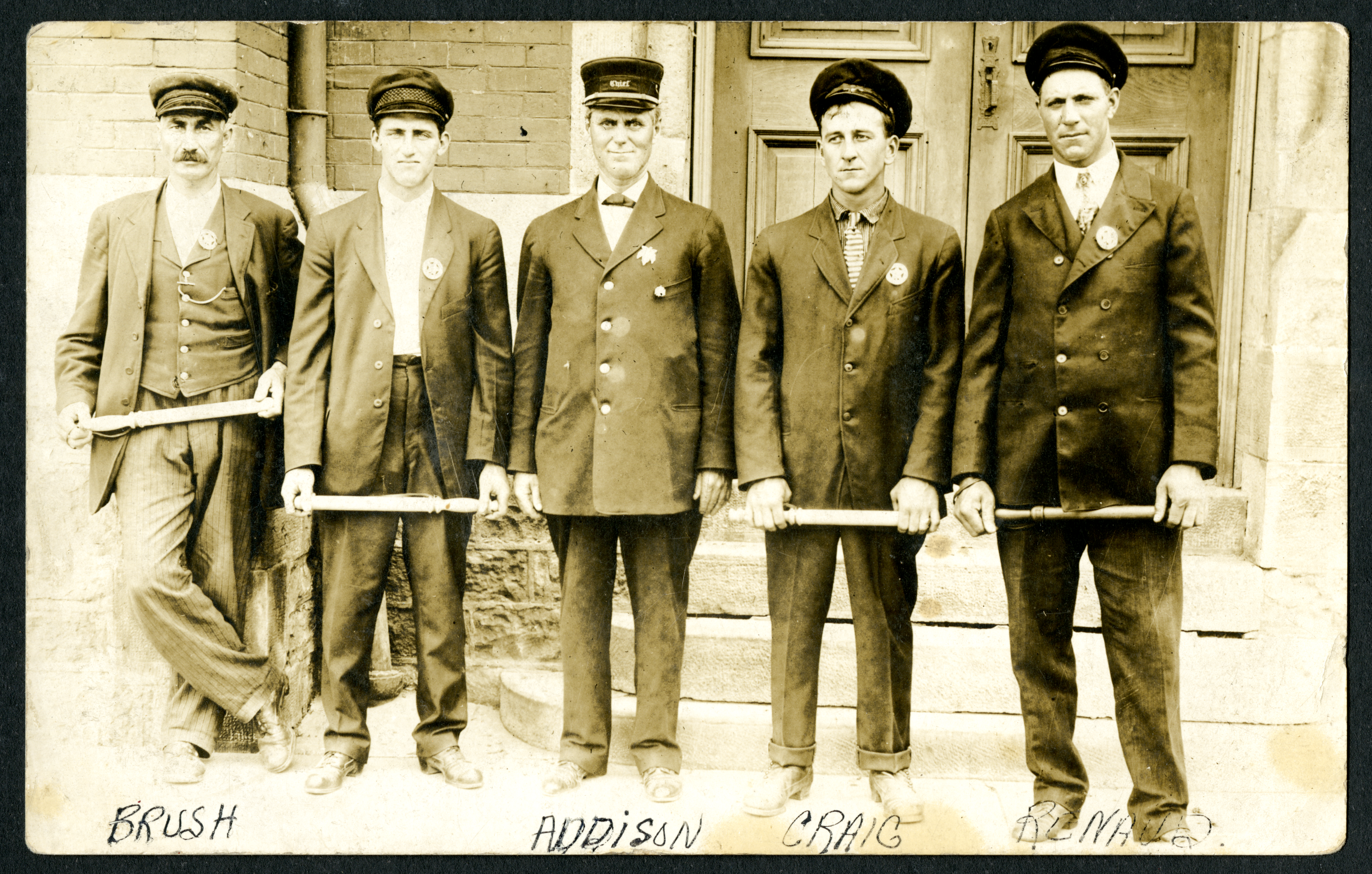
Amherstburg Police Force showing Chief Addison and Chief Detective Renaud, [ca. 1912]

The Amherstburg Police Service was dissolved at the end of 2018, with its officers and responsibilities transferred to a detachment of the Windsor Police Service.

== Education ==
The local public high school in Amherstburg is North Star High School. Up until 2022 the high school was General Amherst High School, named after Jeffrey Amherst, 1st Baron Amherst. Although North Star High School is located in the town, some youth residents choose to attend St. Thomas of Villanova Catholic Secondary School, located near the neighbourhood of River Canard. French-speaking students in Amherstburg may also attend École Secondaire E.J. Lajeunesse, located in Windsor, Ontario.

== Tourist attractions ==
Amherstburg is home to several tourist attractions, including Fort Malden and the Amherstburg Freedom Museum (formerly the North American Black Historical Museum). This explores the history of African-American refugees in western Ontario, who sought freedom from slavery and made their homes here.

An Ontario Historical Plaque was erected in Amherstburg by the province to commemorate Bellevue House. Built c. 1816–19, it was the home of Catherine Reynolds, a landscape painter, and her brother Robert Reynolds. Further plaques are located at the Christ Church, built in 1819, which detail the church as well as Colonel William Caldwell of Fort Malden. Additional tourist attractions include the Park House Museum and King's Navy Yard Park, both of which are located in the heart of old Amherstburg.

The Gibson Gallery is located in a former Michigan Central Railroad Station (c. 1896), which has been fully restored. The gallery operates year-round, featuring exhibits by local artists, the permanent collection of the Art Gallery of Windsor, travelling exhibits from Ontario museums and galleries, and student art/photography exhibits. A restored Essex Terminal railway caboose is operated as a railway museum. Gordon House was built in 1798 as a residence overlooking the Detroit River. Since being restored, it houses a Marine exhibit.

Postcard depicting the Old Eliott Home, Amherstburg, Ontario, [ca. 1910]

The Holiday Beach Conservation Area is one of the best fall birding sites in North America for viewing migratory birds. The 546-acre (2.21 km^{2}) nature reserve contains over 2,000 feet (610 m) of beaches, picnic areas, a 2-kilometre (6,600 ft) trail along the edge of Big Creek Marsh. Holiday Beach is considered a premiere spot to view the fall migration of raptors (birds of prey). A 'Festival of Hawks' event takes place in September.

BobLo Island, which has been developed into a 240-acre private residential community, also has white sand beaches, full-service marina, nature trails, the BobLo Island Beach House Restaurant, Captain Bob‘s Island Ice Cream and Coffee Cabin and South Beach Water Sports. BobLo is accessible via a 10-minute private ferry ride, which runs every 20 minutes, 365 days per year.

== Economy ==
Amherstburg is a town of trade and services to support regional agriculture. It has also become known for several wineries in the area. Amherstburg Farmers' Market is open every Saturday, from 8:30am to 3:30pm. The Farmer's Market is located at the end of Howard Avenue near County Rd 20.

Amherstburg also has a high proportion of retirement residences and second homes.

Local industry includes Diageo, a whiskey bottling plant for the Crown Royal Canadian whiskey (closing early 2026), Windsor Mold's Precision Plastics, one of Ontario's largest full-service suppliers of industrial plastics and thermoplastic, and Honeywell Performance Materials and Technology. Marathon Oil has a coke storage site near the river.

=== Chemical plant history ===
The production at the Honeywell plant of hydrofluoric acid (HF) was suspended in October 2013 in favour of a plant in Geismar, Louisiana. The Honeywell plant is used in the production of fuels, refrigerants, and other materials. HF is a precursor to numerous pharmaceuticals, as well as being used to produce Teflon, fluoropolymers and fluorocarbons. Because of its highly corrosive nature, HF is also used to dissolve glass, in glass etching and frosting, and is used in quartz purification, chemical milling, steel pickling and cleaning silicon wafers. It is produced by treating the mineral fluorite with sulfuric acid, which produces hydrogen fluoride and calcium sulfate. The plant, which is located at 395 Front Rd, North, had previously suspended its operations between 1992 and 1996. There is hope locally that production will resume at some future time.

The plant's gypsum pond was identified in 2008 as the source of high levels of arsenic pollution in the area, which have been a provincial Ministry of the Environment concern since 2006.

Honeywell now owns the adjacent Brunner Mond chemical plant and soda ash settling basins site, whose former owners, General Chemical Industrial Products, declared bankruptcy in 2005. This site was used since 1920 to manufacture calcium chloride and other chemicals, which were shipped from a deep water port on the Detroit River. The site has been since April 2012 the subject of remediation work, supervised by CH2M Hill.

The plant was once part of Allied Chemical, which retained it when it sold the soda ash and calcium chloride operations and Amherst Quarries to General Chemical. The plant is composed of three separate parcels connected through rights of way and easements. In 1999, Allied Signal merged with the much smaller Honeywell Inc. but chose to carry on the newly expanded corporation under the Honeywell name.

== Transportation ==
In September 2022, Transit Windsor began a providing service between Amherstburg and Windsor (the nearest local metropolis), on a two-year pilot project.

Commercial rail service is provided through Essex Terminal Railway, which operates a 35 km line to Windsor.

The former Michigan Central Railway/CASO railway linking Amherstburg to Essex was converted into the Cypher Systems Group Greenway rail trail in stages beginning in 2007, with the two stream bridges being rehabilitated for public use again in 2017.

Small boats are welcome to call at any one of three local marinas that serve Lake Erie and the Detroit River.

Amherstburg Ferry Company operates private ferry service to Bob-Lo Island community. The ferry service once operated MS Windmill Point, a car ferry acquired in 1960s after the Ogdensburg–Prescott Ferry service closed following the opening of the Ogdensburg–Prescott International Bridge. In July 2020, the Amherstburg Ferry Company acquired the Daldean Ferry which had been operating on the St. Clair River between since 1951.

== Sports ==
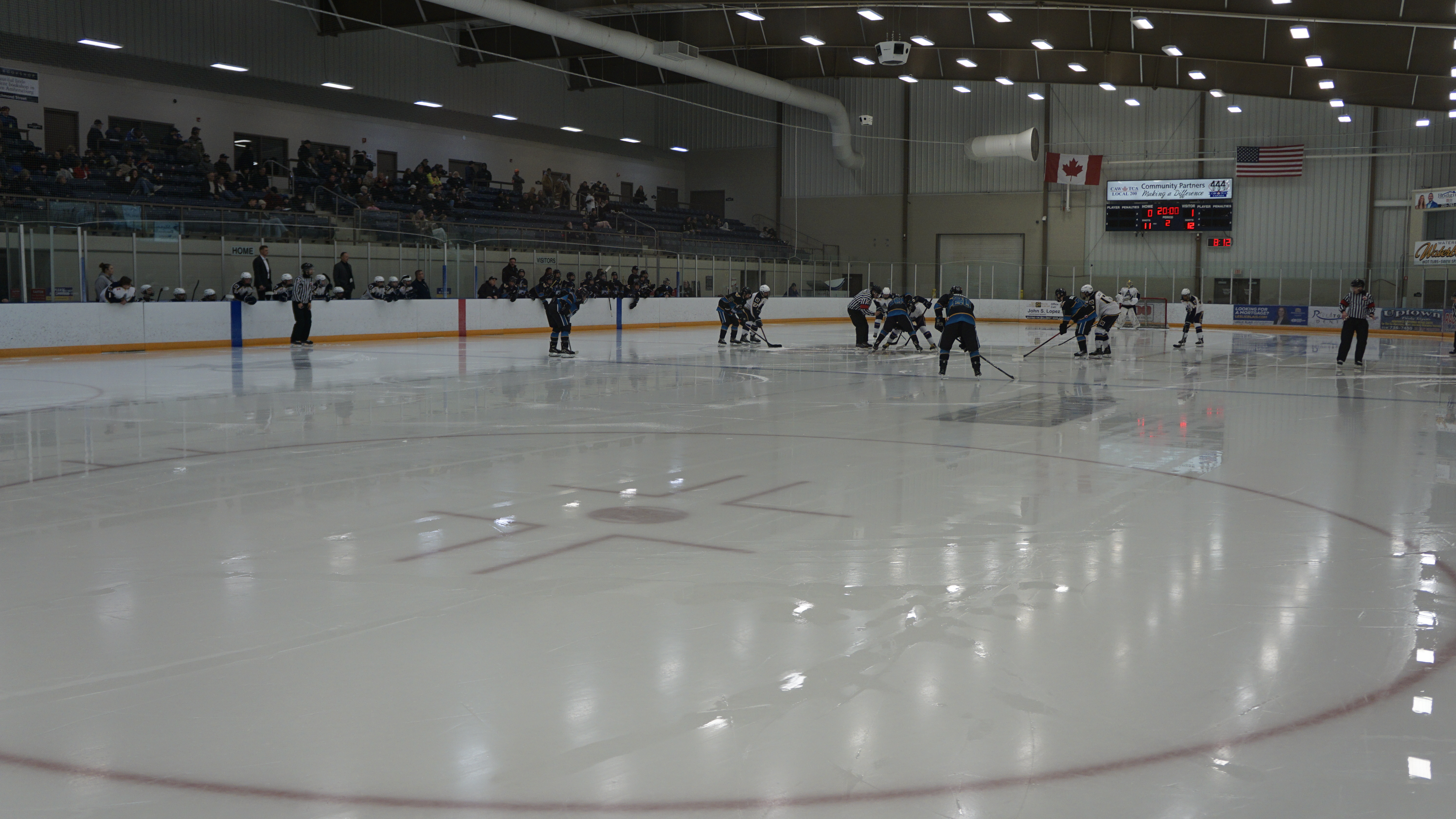
An Amherstburg Admirals home game.

Amherstburg is home to the following competitive sports teams:

- Amherstburg Admirals Jr. C Hockey
- Amherstburg Stars Minor Hockey
- Amherstburg Cardinals Baseball
- Amherstburg Timberwolves Football
- North Star High School Wolves (various Men's and Women's sports teams)

The Amherstburg North Stars Midget "B" hockey team were winners of the 1976 OMHA playdowns and winners of the town's first-ever OMHA All-Ontario title for any age group.

The Amherstburg North Stars Juvenile "BB" hockey team were the winners of the 1977 OMHA playdowns and winners of the town's first-ever OMHA All-Ontario title for that age group.

The Amherstburg Stars Midget "A" hockey team were winners of the 2010 and 2011 OMHA playdowns and winners of the town's first-ever OHF title.

== Festivals ==
In the first week of every August, Amherstburg holds a heritage festival, consisting of activities at several locations around town. At Fort Malden, re-enactors depict eras ranging from the Roman Empire to the Second World War, establishing camps and performing battle demonstrations.

Since 2006, Amherstburg has held an annual Shores of Erie Wine Festival. As of 2017, the event has been cancelled indefinitely after a liquor breach fine and the death of a teenager in 2014.

Amherstburg also celebrates Canada Day with a yearly fireworks display and a day of family activities.

Art by the River (established in 1967), is an annual two-day arts and craft festival that takes place the weekend before Labour Day weekend on the grounds of Fort Malden National Historic Site.

Other festivities include:

- TRUE Fest – inclusive disco dance party in the streets (January)
- Amherstburg Fort Malden Horticultural Society Garden Tour (June)
- Open Air Weekends (June–September)
- Canada Day Celebrations & Fireworks (July 1)
- Ribfest (June)
- Woofa Roo Pet Festival (June)
- Gone Crazy Car Show, showcasing hundreds of vintage classics (July)
- Art by the River on the beautiful Fort Malden grounds (last weekend in August)
- The Uncommon Festival (September)
- Santa Parade (Late November)
- River Lights (November through December)

== Climate ==
Based on the Köppen climate classification, Amherstburg borders between a humid continental climate (Dfa) and a humid subtropical climate (Cfa), due to its warmest month showing a mean temperature above 22.0 °C (71.6 °F), and its coldest month having a mean temperature that is not lower than −3.0 °C (26.6 °F).

Climate data for Amherstburg (1981–2010)
Month	Jan	Feb	Mar	Apr	May	Jun	Jul	Aug	Sep	Oct	Nov	Dec	Year
Record high °C (°F)	15.0 (59.0)	19.0 (66.2)	24.5 (76.1)	30.0 (86.0)	33.0 (91.4)	36.0 (96.8)	38.0 (100.4)	37.0 (98.6)	34.0 (93.2)	28.5 (83.3)	23.0 (73.4)	18.0 (64.4)	38.0 (100.4)
Mean daily maximum °C (°F)	0.5 (32.9)	2.1 (35.8)	7.1 (44.8)	14.2 (57.6)	20.5 (68.9)	26.1 (79.0)	28.5 (83.3)	27.4 (81.3)	23.3 (73.9)	15.9 (60.6)	8.7 (47.7)	2.3 (36.1)	14.7 (58.5)
Daily mean °C (°F)	−3.0 (26.6)	−1.8 (28.8)	2.3 (36.1)	8.9 (48.0)	15.0 (59.0)	20.8 (69.4)	23.2 (73.8)	22.3 (72.1)	18.1 (64.6)	11.3 (52.3)	5.1 (41.2)	−1.0 (30.2)	10.1 (50.2)
Mean daily minimum °C (°F)	−6.5 (20.3)	−5.7 (21.7)	−2.4 (27.7)	3.5 (38.3)	9.4 (48.9)	15.4 (59.7)	17.9 (64.2)	17.3 (63.1)	12.9 (55.2)	6.6 (43.9)	1.3 (34.3)	−4.2 (24.4)	5.5 (41.9)
Record low °C (°F)	−28 (−18)	−22.5 (−8.5)	−20.5 (−4.9)	−8 (18)	−2.0 (28.4)	5.0 (41.0)	8.0 (46.4)	8.0 (46.4)	1.0 (33.8)	−5 (23)	−10.5 (13.1)	−22.5 (−8.5)	−28 (−18)
Average precipitation mm (inches)	66.2 (2.61)	54.9 (2.16)	62.5 (2.46)	89.4 (3.52)	96.8 (3.81)	79.6 (3.13)	81.2 (3.20)	81.9 (3.22)	85.6 (3.37)	74.2 (2.92)	71.1 (2.80)	62.7 (2.47)	906.0 (35.67)
Average rainfall mm (inches)	40.0 (1.57)	38.1 (1.50)	46.7 (1.84)	86.1 (3.39)	96.8 (3.81)	79.6 (3.13)	81.2 (3.20)	81.9 (3.22)	85.6 (3.37)	73.8 (2.91)	68.1 (2.68)	44.9 (1.77)	822.7 (32.39)
Average snowfall cm (inches)	26.2 (10.3)	16.7 (6.6)	15.9 (6.3)	3.3 (1.3)	0.0 (0.0)	0.0 (0.0)	0.0 (0.0)	0.0 (0.0)	0.0 (0.0)	0.4 (0.2)	3.0 (1.2)	17.8 (7.0)	83.3 (32.8)
Average precipitation days (≥ 0.2 mm)	12.0	9.1	11.7	13.6	12.8	10.1	10.5	10.0	9.2	10.4	11.8	12.4	133.5
Average rainy days (≥ 0.2 mm)	6.6	5.5	8.8	12.8	12.8	10.1	10.5	10.0	9.2	10.4	10.7	7.8	115.1
Average snowy days (≥ 0.2 cm)	6.6	4.6	4.1	1.6	0.0	0.0	0.0	0.0	0.0	0.16	1.4	5.8	24.3
Source: Environment Canada

== Demographics ==
Historical populations
Year	Pop.	±%
1841	985	—
1871	1,936	+96.5%
1881	2,672	+38.0%
1891	2,279	−14.7%
1901	2,222	−2.5%
1911	2,560	+15.2%
1921	2,769	+8.2%
1931	2,759	−0.4%
1941	2,853	+3.4%
1951	3,638	+27.5%
1956	4,099	+12.7%
1961	4,452	+8.6%
1971	5,169	+16.1%
1981	5,685	+10.0%
1991	8,921	+56.9%
1996	19,273	+116.0%
2001	20,339	+5.5%
2006	21,748	+6.9%
2011	21,556	−0.9%
2016	21,936	+1.8%
2021	23,524	+7.2%

In the 2021 Census of Population conducted by Statistics Canada, Amherstburg had a population of 23,524 living in 9,193 of its 9,548 total private dwellings, a change of 7.2% from its 2016 population of 21,936. With a land area of 183.76 km^{2} (70.95 sq mi), it had a population density of 128.0/km^{2} (331.6/sq mi) in 2021.

Canada census – Amherstburg community profile

	2021	2016	2011
Population	23,524 (+7.2% from 2016)	21,936 (1.8% from 2011)	21,556 (-0.9% from 2006)
Land area	183.76 km^{2} (70.95 sq mi)	185.61 km^{2} (71.66 sq mi)	185.68 km^{2} (71.69 sq mi)
Population density	128/km^{2} (330/sq mi)	118.2/km^{2} (306/sq mi)	116.1/km^{2} (301/sq mi)
Median age	45.6 (M: 44.4, F: 46.4)	42.2 (M: , F: )	42.2 (M: 41.6, F: 42.8)
Private dwellings	9,548 (total) 9,193 (occupied)	8951 (total)	8600 (total)
Median household income	$$98,000

References: 2021 2016 2011

Population trend for former municipalities:

- Population in 2001: 20,339
  - Amherstburg (former town): 10,822
  - Anderdon (former township): 6331
  - Malden (former township): 3186
- Population total in 1996: 19,273
  - Amherstburg (town): 10,245
  - Anderdon (township): 5730
  - Malden (township): 3298
- Population total in 1991: 17,577
  - Amherstburg (town): 8921
  - Anderdon (township): 5502
  - Malden (township): 3155

== Notable people ==
- Sally Ainse – Oneida diplomat and fur trader
- Shelton Brooks – songwriter/composer
- Seth Bullock – Wild West sheriff, hardware store owner and U.S. Marshal
- Robert T. Burton – early Mormon leader and Utah pioneer, born in Amherstburg
- Jay "Nig" Clarke – Major League Baseball player
- George "Rube" Deneau – early minor league baseball player, manager and promoter
- Norman Hackett – actor, born in Amherstburg
- Terry Jones – racing driver
- Malcolm Knight – economist and financier
- Henry William McKenny – politician, Liberal member of the Legislative Assembly of Alberta 1905 – 1917
- Richard Peddie – former president and CEO of Maple Leafs Sports and Entertainment
- John Richardson – military officer and author
- Anne M. Squire – 31st Moderator of the United Church of Canada
- Wesley Weber – counterfeiter
- Kevin Westgarth – Stanley Cup Champion and former NHL player
- Eugene Whelan – politician, Federal Minister of Agriculture, born in Anderdon Township

== See also ==
- List of municipalities in Ontario
- List of townships in Ontario
