= Fort Malden =

History museum in Amherstburg, Ontario, Canada

Coordinates: 42.1070°N 83.1132°W

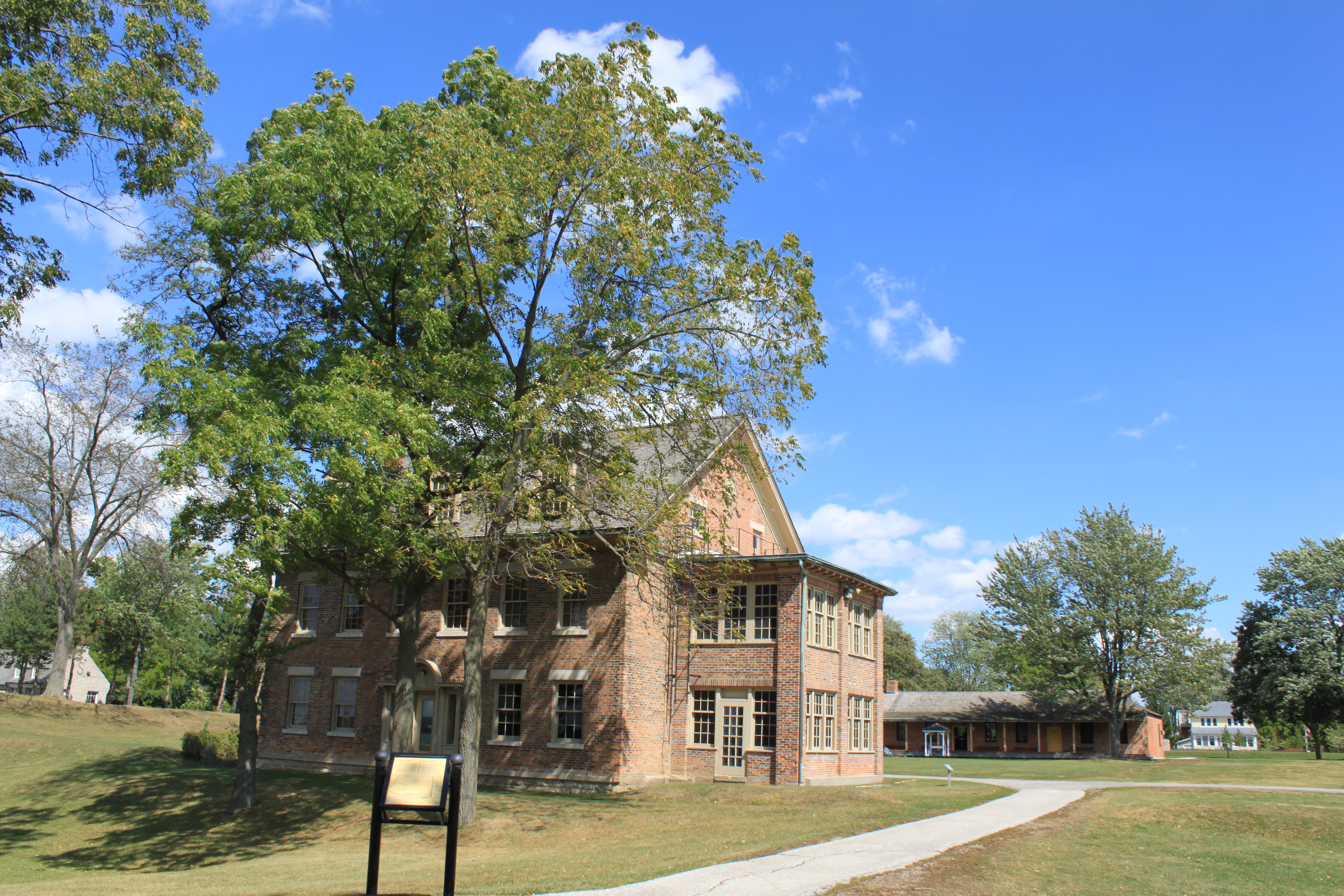
- The museum, standing in front of the restored soldiers' barracks
- Established: 1796
- Location: Amherstburg, Ontario Canada.
- Type: Military Fortification
- Website: https://www.pc.gc.ca/en/lhn-nhs/on/malden/

National Historic Site of Canada
- Designated: 1921

Fort Malden, formally known as Fort Amherstburg, is a defence fortification in Amherstburg, Ontario, Canada. It was built in 1795 by Great Britain in order to ensure the security of British North America against any potential threat of American invasion. Throughout its history, it is most known for its military application during the War of 1812 as Sir Isaac Brock and Tecumseh met here to plan the Siege of Detroit. It was the British stronghold during the war and is now a National Historic Site of Canada. The fort also had an important role in securing Upper Canada's border with Detroit during the Upper Canada Rebellion.

Fort Malden also has rich and diverse history aside from its military applications. For example, it was the setting for the British Pensioner Scheme and would later become an Ontario Provincial Asylum in 1859. After the asylum was closed, Fort Malden was surveyed and privatized until the mid-nineteenth century. The historic designation of the fort came after several decades of local residents advocating for the preservation of the fort to the federal government. Officially recognized in 1921, the complex of Fort Malden as it is seen today was brought together in 1946 with the purchase of the Hough House.

Today, the fort remains open and accessible to the public under the supervision of Parks Canada. Visitors are able to see for themselves a wide array of Fort Malden's history as all of the buildings on the complex represent different time periods within that history. For example, an 1819 Brick Barrack restored in the style of one in 1839 is found directly across from the Hough House that represents the fort's history as an asylum, a lumber mill, and a private residence.

== History ==
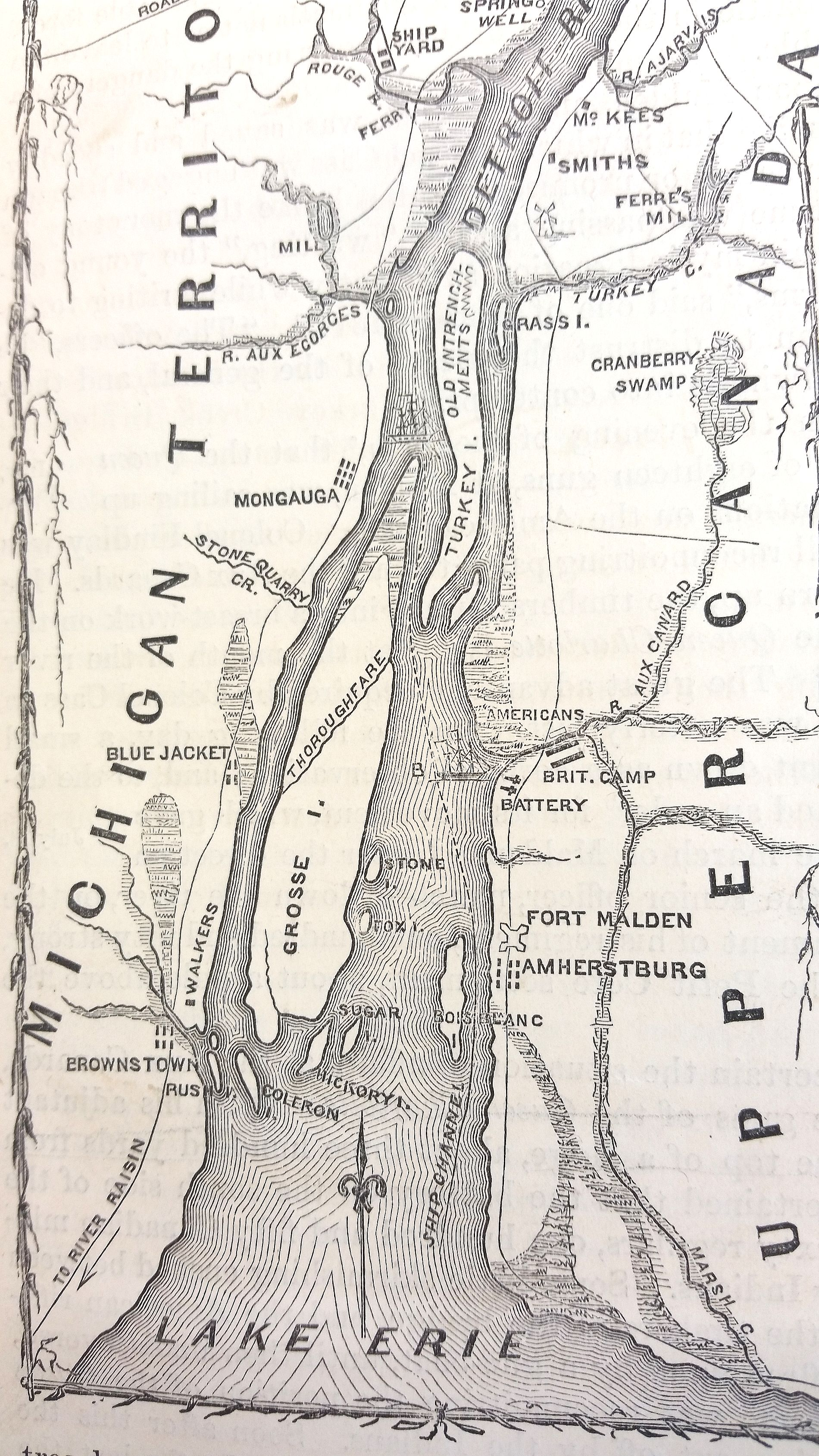
Location of Fort Malden just above Amherstburg

=== Before 1795 ===
After the Indian Land Grant of 1784, it was decided by Governor Sir Frederick Haldimand that the land opposite of Bois Blanc Island (now Amherstburg) was to be used as a strategic military defence post. In his book "Fort Malden and the Old Fort Days," Rev. Thomas Nattress asserts that, prior to the land grant, the area was used by the Natives as a strategic military defence post.

The Royal Canadian Volunteers began construction of Fort Amherstburg in 1786. The fort served to maintain British influence among Indigenous tribes in the west. The fort was expanded in the years before the War of 1812, and included the King's Navy Yard for the construction and maintenance of Provincial Marine vessels on the Upper Great Lakes (Lakes Erie, Huron, and Superior). During the War of 1812 the fort was Britain's main defence on the Detroit frontier.

=== 1795–1812 ===
The British forces based at Fort Detroit had to be withdrawn following the 1795 Jay Treaty and were re-assigned to Fort Malden. In January 1797 Captain Mayne, received word from Robert Prescott, commander-in-chief of the British troops in Canada, that the military post was to officially be known as Fort Amherstburg; named in commemoration of General Lord Amherst, a British Commander during the Seven Years' War. This title has never been formally changed. However, because the fort lay in the township of Malden, its inhabitants and the locals came to commonly and colloquially refer to it as Fort Malden. The name "Fort Malden" has remained ever since.

=== 1812–1814: The War of 1812 ===
Fort Malden's involvement in the War of 1812 began on 2 July 1812, when British forces at Amherstburg captured the American schooner Cuyahoga. The United States declaration of war on Great Britain was made on 18 June of that year; yet, on 1 July, the US Army General William Hull had still not received word of this development. Hull had chartered the Cuyahoga to transport goods and army records, officers' wives, and the ill from Toledo, Ohio to Detroit, Michigan Territory, passing by Amherstburg. In the deep water channel of the Detroit River, the Cuyahoga was captured by the British brig General Hunter. General Hull's reaction came on 12 July when, under his command, American forces crossed the Detroit River east of Sandwich (now Windsor, Ontario) and took the town without opposition. Sandwich was to be used as a base of operations for the American advance into Upper Canada, with General Hull commandeering the Francois Baby House as his headquarters. On 13 July, Hull issued this proclamation to the residents of Upper Canada:

INHABITANTS of CANADA!

After thirty years of PEACE & prosperity, the UNITED STATES have been driven to Arms. The injuries & aggressions, the insults & indignities of Great Britain have once more left them no alternative but manly resistance or unconditional submission. The ARMY under my command has invaded your country, & the Standard of the UNION now waves over the Territory of CANADA. To the peaceable unoffending inhabitant, it brings neither danger nor difficulty. I come to find enemies, not to snake them. I come to protect, not to injure you.

If the barbarous & savage policy of Great Britain be pursued, and the savages are let loose to murder our citizens, & butcher our women and children, the war, will be a war of extermination.

The first stroke of the Tomahawk, the first attempt with the scalping knife, will be the signal for one indiscriminate scene of desolation. No white man found fighting by the side of an Indian, will be taken prisoner. Instant destruction will be his lot.

The UNITED STATES offer you peace, liberty and security. Your choice lies between these & WAR, slavery, and destruction. Choose then, but choose wisely; and may he who knows the justice of our cause; and who holds in his hand the fate of NATIONS, guide you to a result the most compatible with your rights and interest, your PEACE and prosperity.

On 16 July, General Hull's army was met with armed British resistance for the first time. A patrol out of Fort Malden engaged with Hull's troops at the River Canard, where two British soldiers were killed, marking the first fatalities of the War of 1812.

Major General Sir Isaac Brock assumed command of Fort Malden on 13 August 1812, and it was Brock who would lead British troops across the Detroit River days later. On 16 August, with the help of Chief Tecumseh's Native warriors, Brock and Tecumseh's forces marched on Fort Detroit. It is reported that Hull was fearful of 'hordes' of Indians swooping down upon the civilian population of Detroit, a fear that Brock and Tecumseh were able to capitalize on by convincing Hull that their ranks included 5,000 of Tecumseh's native warriors. It is largely due to the unsettling effect that the Native allies' presence had upon General Hull that Fort Detroit was surrendered without resistance. The success of the Siege of Detroit was an important factor in securing First Nations' support for the British at Fort Malden during the War of 1812.

Throughout the War of 1812, the Detroit frontier had been considered "a distant and expendable outer branch" of the colony that the British were willing to sacrifice in order to protect Montreal and Quebec in Lower Canada, and Niagara and Kingston in Upper Canada. As such, strategic losses at York and Niagara during the spring of 1813 placed the fate of Upper Canada's western territory in jeopardy. Resources had been directed to the Niagara region, and with no chance of receiving significant reinforcements General Henry Proctor was forced to abandon Fort Malden in September 1813. Fort Malden was torched, and the fort's inhabitants fled, with American troops in pursuit. After engaging the Americans at the Battle of the Thames, General Proctor was eventually successful in his retreat to Niagara.

Soldiers from the fort repelled the invaders at the River Canard. After Hull withdrew back to Fort Detroit in August, British Major General Isaac Brock and the Shawnee war leader Tecumseh met at Fort Amherstburg to plan the attack of Fort Detroit in the British Indian Department building next to the fort. Hull surrendered after a brief siege. The fort was the staging area for the British victory in January 1813 at the Battle of Frenchtown, and for the attacks on Fort Meigs and Fort Stevenson later that year.

In September 1813, the British commander, Major General Henry Procter, ordered Fort Amherstburg destroyed and began a retreat east towards Burlington Heights. The retreat was the result of the British naval defeat at the Battle of Lake Erie, including the capture of the flagship, HMS Detroit (1813) (built at the King's Naval Yard) which severed Procter's supply line. Procter's decision was also based on the fact that most of the fort's guns had been placed aboard the vessels of the British squadron and were lost during the engagement. Procter was subsequently defeated a few weeks later by forces led by Major General William Henry Harrison at the Battle of the Thames.

=== 1813–1815: American occupation ===
After General Proctor abandoned and burned Fort Malden in the fall of 1813, American forces occupied the towns of Sandwich and Amherstburg, including the land that the fort had stood on. During this time, the territory was used to conduct supply raids into nearby Chatham-Kent and London, Upper Canada. The Americans also began reconstruction of Fort Malden near its original location. After the U.S. ratification of the Treaty of Ghent in February 1815 ended the war, the border between the United States and British North America was restored, returning the property of Amherstburg and Fort Malden to the British. The American army officially withdrew from Fort Malden on 1 July 1815.

=== 1837–1838: Upper Canada Rebellion ===
After sitting in disrepair for quite some time, Fort Malden was once again used to house military personnel and launch military operations to quell the Upper Canada Rebellion. Most of Fort Malden's involvement dealt with defending Upper Canada from American sympathizers belonging to Hunters' Lodges, who were frequently embarking on border raids along the Detroit River. As a result of the United States now posing a real threat to the sovereignty of Upper Canada, Fort Malden underwent a period of development where several buildings were constructed and military earthworks repaired. Much of this development was conducted under the supervision of Major H.D. Townshend in 1838, with the 24th and 32nd Regiment occupying the fort. During this period, there were three regiments, including the Royal Artillery, stationed at Fort Malden to act as a defence against a possible American invasion.

One such attempt by American "Hunter" Patriots occurred on 9 January 1838, when they attempted to raid the town of Amherstburg by crossing the Detroit River on the schooner Anne. All three regiments, including bands of town militia and Native American warriors, successfully defended the town, taking twenty American prisoners including their commander "Brigadier-General" Edward Alexander Theller. There were also two other battles occurring at Fighting Island and Pelee Island, where a detachment of the Royal Artillery was dispatched to defend against the brigand attacks. However, once the violence of the Upper Canada Rebellion was quelled, the fort no longer required so many active military regiments. Consequently, the Royal Artillery left between June and July 1839 and the 32nd Regiment also withdrew, disbanding the militia a few months later.

=== 1839–1858: The Pensioner Scheme ===
As the regiments were leaving the fort and taking with them much of their military defence arms, the townsfolk of Amherstburg complained that they no longer were properly defended against an American invasion. The result was the stationing of the 34th (Cumberland) Regiment of Foot at Fort Malden. While there no longer existed any immediate threat of invasion to Upper Canada, the regiment was employed to improve the defence and utility of the fort in the event that Upper Canada would again be under threat. It was during this time from 1839 to 1840 that Fort Malden underwent its second stage of development under the supervision of Sir Richard Airey, during which more barracks and store houses were constructed. In 1840, there was a decision made to actually replace Fort Malden with an entirely new defence construction in Amherstburg. This would have been described as the third stage of building development from 1840–1842; however, such plans never came to fruition as the United States and Britain signed the Webster–Ashburton Treaty after several years of negotiations.

The result was that Fort Malden was used mainly to house existing or disbanded regiments as a stable garrison, such as the Royal Canadian Rifle Regiment from 1842 to 1851 which was composed of veteran English soldiers. As there was no pressing military threat, life for both soldiers and townsfolk in Amherstburg was considered rather peaceful and marked as a period of growth both for the town and the fort. From 1851 to 1859 Fort Malden was occupied by army pensioners in what is known as the Pensioner Scheme. During this period, the town of Amherstburg and Fort Malden were redesigned to accommodate the large numbers of retired military men living in Upper Canada. As Canada had received responsible government following the Rebellions of 1837–1838, Britain no longer needed to maintain a significant military presence. It has been argued that in order to bring about the easiest transition for traditionally military defence towns such as Amherstburg, Britain enforced the Pensioner Scheme to substitute the standing regular army with pensioners to maintain the authoritative military presence.

About 350 individual army pensioners, along with their families, occupied Amherstburg as part of the Pensioner Scheme. They were offered homes and small land grants in accordance with the Ordnance Reserves where in exchange they were employed by the province to act as police and an interim military force. The scheme at Fort Malden was considered to be very successful, not only for the pensioners but also the development of the town. Remaining either continually employed or receiving a full military pension, the retired soldiers were important financial assets to Amherstburg's local economy. Additionally, the pensioners, many being Irish Catholic, added to the cultural development of Amherstburg, maintaining a strong presence until about the 1890s. There are several surviving pensioners' cottages remaining on the grounds of Fort Malden and surrounding the King's Navy Yard that are considered focal points in Historic Amherstburg and remain accessible to the public for tours.

The historic location of the Military Reserve (pension home area) is just northwest of Centennial Park in Amherstburg (Sandwich Street South on the west, Richmond Street to the south, Victoria Street to the east and to north of St. Arnaud Street) and was about 9,000,000 square feet large.

=== 1859–1875: The Asylum Years ===
In 1859, the Pensioner Scheme was abandoned by the British government and ownership of Fort Malden was turned over to the province of Ontario. On 8 June 1859, an Order in Council within the Ontario government determined that Fort Malden would be recommissioned as a provincial insane asylum. Fort Malden was one of many examples where prior ordnance lands were repurposed by order of the province to become asylums, hospitals, or prisons, as these prior forts already possessed many fortified buildings and defences suited for institutional facilities. It was determined that the Malden Lunatic Asylum would act as an extension of the Toronto Lunatic Asylum to house surplus patients. However, many of Fort Malden's buildings had been relatively neglected and so much of the first couple years of the fort's history as an asylum was allotted to necessary reconstruction. This remodeling was performed primarily under the architectural supervision of Kivas Tully who used several of the patients as labourers to help build and remodel the asylum's structures. Some of the early remodeling was concerned with repairing the barracks to serve as separate wings for the male and female patients, as well as converting the brick hospital into a kitchen, with the guard house becoming the porter's apartment, used to house the water supply pump, and the officer's quarters becoming the home of the doctor's family.

The First Medical Superintendent of the Malden Lunatic Asylum was Dr. Andrew Fisher. Under his tenure, several more buildings were constructed, such as a replacement laundry building in 1861 that would later be known as the Hough House. Later, in 1864, additions were added to the officer's quarters and staff sergeant's guardhouse. Additionally, in 1860, Dr. Fisher was responsible for the asylum's grounds being enclosed as two thousand yards of fenced-in outdoor space for patient recreation. This could be argued as reflecting Dr. Fisher's more progressive therapeutic methodology of patient treatment. For example, he had the asylum's grounds continually landscaped, established an accessible library for patients, and offered weekly dances and religious services for patient enjoyment. In addition, Dr. Fisher did not place patients in solitary confinement nor prescribe many medications, as is reflected in the 1862 annual asylum report where only $95.13 was recorded to have been spent on narcotics. However, the asylum's other practices do reflect the hegemonic attitudes towards mental illness during the nineteenth century. While the institution's medicinal expenses remained relatively low, this is likely due to the fact that alcohol was used instead in several treatments, as reflected in the same 1862 report, which cited that $1,125.88 was spent on liquor. Additionally, Dr. Fisher employed his patients as laborers for the asylum, with men doing much of the physical building repairs and women performing housekeeping chores such as laundry. The average length of stay for patients at the Toronto- Malden-London asylum system was eighteen years in the 1860s with a discharge rate of 60% by 1869. During the fort's time as the Malden Provincial Lunatic Asylum approximately 260 patients, mostly considered "quiet chronics", were treated. Most of the patients treated in 1861 are listed as having been born in Ireland out of the 219 patients registered that year.

In 1867, Dr. Fisher was forced to resign for alleged financial irregularities in the management of the Fort with Dr. Henry Landor replacing him as the superintendent. Under Dr. Landor's tenure, the asylum underwent several changes. For example, he supervised many building conversions, such as the cook house's transitioning into a laundry site, the porter's lodge becoming a store room, and the old ordnance store's conversion into a barn for threshing oats. Additionally, Dr. Landor revoked the "quiet chronics" policy and admitted to the asylum more acute violent and suicidal patients. In the early 1870s, Dr. Landor shared the duties of medical superintendent with a Dr. Milligan. In total, 30 employees worked at the Malden Lunatic Asylum with several being described as former pensioners. There are a few names of employees that are also found on the 1861 list of admitted patients, such as laundress Mary McGowan. Additionally, for a brief period of time, deceased inmates were buried at the asylum until construction of the Rose Hill Cemetery had been completed.

In 1870, the Malden Lunatic Asylum was closed and its patients relocated to the London Lunatic Asylum as the Malden branch had always been considered a temporary location within the Provincial Lunatic Asylum system. The fort remained relatively abandoned until 1875, except for a caretaker on staff to oversee the landscape and building maintenance. However, it should be mentioned that the closing of the asylum was a great detriment to the economy of the town of Amherstburg. For almost sixteen years the asylum acted as a steady market for locally produced goods. Additionally, the asylum was the single largest employer in 1861 for the town. As a result, while Fort Malden would serve several different functions throughout its history, it would always remain of utmost importance to Amherstburg's economy and development engendered by and originating from its military days.

=== 1876–1935: Survey Division ===
In 1875, after remaining abandoned for almost five years, Fort Malden was surveyed by the town of Amherstburg and sold at public auction. Known as the Ordnance Lands, eleven lots were created out of the former fort and sold to several prominent families within the town. As a result, Laird Avenue, North Street, and Dalhousie Street were designed to allow access to the now subdivided lots. Lots A and B were reserved by the Ontario government and leased back to the town of Amherstburg to be used as a park space and to host agricultural fairs. The main fort complex, known as Lot 4, was purchased by a local dentist, Andrew Borrowman, to be used as a speculative property. Lots 1, 2, and 3, which contained therein the original location of the medical superintendent's house on the asylum grounds, were purchased by John McLeod. The Falls family purchased the largest section of the lots that bordered the Detroit River, with other smaller owners being H.G. Duff and F.P. Scratch. The other smaller lots were intended for residential use. Soon after Andrew Borrowman purchased Lot 4, he began to lease the land to John R. Park & William Borrowman to serve as the location of their Park & Borrowman Lumber Mill. Many of the buildings that had remained from the asylum years where either destroyed or converted to suit the industrial needs of the lumber mill. For example, the previous laundry building had been converted into the company's titular mill. Not much is known about Park & Borrowman Lumber Mill except for the fact that the company remained inactive during the First World War, resulting in one of the owner's daughters selling the property in 1918 to Franklin A. Hough.

Meanwhile, John McLeod died in 1891, leaving Lots 1, 2, and 3 to his widow who, from 1891 until 1907, had begun to slowly sell off the property. The main buyers were the Falls brothers, who purchased a bulk of the lots in 1900 and thus further subdivided the land. In 1908, W. S. Falls purchased the prior medical superintendent's residence of the Malden Lunatic Asylum and in 1917 began to construct residences on the property. The Falls brothers sold Lot 3 where the former superintendent's residence had been in 1926 to a retired Detroit lawyer, Malcolm McGregor. Later known as the McGregor House, he had Lot 3 undergo many changes, such as landscaping the old southeast bastion and ditch to become a botanical garden and destroying the southeast portion of the fort to allow for even more residential homes to be built along the waterfront.

However, the most lasting change to the landscape of the Fort Malden was enacted by Franklin A. Hough, who had purchased Lot 4. A former one-term mayor of Amherstburg from 1907 to 1909, Hough had trained to become a lawyer and practiced as a junior partner at Reade & Kirkland in Amherstburg. His intention was to purchase Lot 4, as well as the former laundry/mill, and alter the land and its building so as to beget a more manorial presence. As a result, he demolished or moved several of the former military buildings that had remained and been converted, such as a brick barracks and the ordnance building off of the property. The most significant change was Hough's decision to remodel the lumber mill into his private residence. Under the architectural supervision of Harold McEvors, he had the mill converted to mimic a Colonial Revival style, completely altering the industrial and architectural character of the building. His design for Lot 4, particularly his intention of creating a manor house, have endured up until the present day and will be maintained according to the "Heritage Character Statement" created by the Federal Heritage Buildings Review Office once Parks Canada determined Fort Malden to be a National Historic Site. Consequently, the privatization of the fort was the focus of the turn of the twentieth century and was facilitated by the development of several manorial estates.

=== 1935–present: The National Historic Site ===
While the previous decades concerned the private ownership of the fort, the mid-twentieth century was focused upon reclaiming the land for public use. The first incident was in 1917 when an issue over unpaid back taxes resulted in the town of Amherstburg seizing a small area of privately owned land known as the Webber property and then turning over ownership of it to the Federal government. In the 1930s, the Cleveland Cliffs Iron and Coal Company were persuaded not to renew their mortgage on the north section of the northeast bastion, which resulted in the town purchasing the land and then turning it over to the Department of Mines and Resources National Parks Division. After the death of Franklin A. Hough in 1946, the Federal government purchased Lot 4. Additionally, in 1958, the Federal government repeated the same action with the McGregor House, purchasing it from his estate.

This acquisition and aggregation of property was due to the fact that there was a growing number of townspeople who were determined to have Fort Malden designated a Heritage Site in order to protect the area. Starting as early as 1904, residents had sent a petition to the Minister of Militia and Defence asking the fort to be reserved as a park. This was done again in 1912, this time with a second petition sent to Sam Hughes, the Minister of Defence. In 1913, a small delegation from Amherstburg met with Prime Minister Robert Borden who had seemed in agreement with them at the time; however, the advent of World War I halted the process. The Historic Sites and Monuments Board recognized the Fort in 1921 and suggested that a plaque be erected to commemorate the area. This particular plaque was finally placed, over ten years later, on the tax defaulted Webber property. In 1938, the Fort Malden Management Committee was formed under the direction of MP S. Murray Clark to advocate for the improvement of the fort and to build a museum. They received approval for the construction of a museum on the Webber property, which was completed in the summer of 1939. The first curator of the museum was Management Committee member David Botsford who was responsible for much of the early archive collection at the fort. Finally, on 28 December 1940, an Order in Council from the Federal Government designated Fort Malden as a National Historic Park with its official opening taking place on 22 June 1941. However, it was not until the purchase of Lot 4 that the Fort come to acquire many of its recognizable features, such as the Hough House, the earthworks, the bastion, the barrack, and the former laundry building. Currently, the National Historic Site is 4.5 hectares (11 acres) and includes the fort itself, the Brick Commissariat building constructed in 1831, the King's Navy Yard Park, and a stone lighthouse built in 1836.

Fort Malden's preservation and the popularity of the site has led to an increased interest in cultivating the Town of Amherstburg's heritage. In addition to the Fort's museum and archive, Fort Malden also offers educational experiences to the public. These tours, group sessions, and camps are primarily geared towards elementary school groups and focus on the fort's military past, as well as the daily settler life in the town.

== Underground Railroad ==
The town of Amherstburg was historically referred to as Fort Malden, or simply Malden, due to the fort's prominence within the settlement's origins and history.

Fort Malden was deemed the "chief place of entry" for those refugees seeking to enter Canada so as to escape slavery within the United States. The abolitionist Levi Coffin supported this assessment, describing Fort Malden as, "the great landing place, the principle terminus of the underground railroad of the west." After 1850, approximately thirty fugitive slaves a day were crossing over to Fort Malden by steamboat. Sultana was one of such ships and made "frequent round trips" between Great Lakes ports. Its captain, C.W. Appleby, a celebrated mariner, facilitated the conveyance of several fugitive slaves from various Lake Erie ports to Fort Malden.

Though many fugitive slaves did not remain in the Amherstburg region, seeking to move far from the border and its threat of recapture, the influx of people made a dramatic and lasting impact upon the character and size of the settlement's population. At the start of the American Civil War, "800 blacks called Fort Malden home" and these refugees constituted forty percent of the area's population. A previous assessment in 1855 estimated the African-Canadian population to be somewhere between 400 and 500 persons, demonstrating that a rapid doubling of the populace occurred within a relatively short period of time due to the massive immigration occurring by way of the fort. The motivation behind such accelerated migration, beyond the obvious horrors of slavery, was the Fugitive Slave Act of 1850, which rendered even those slaves who had escaped to the northern states vulnerable to capture and punishment, as well as those who assisted them.

There exists unique terminology that developed in association with the Underground Railroad that contributed towards its secretive and covert nature. Detroit, the location from which most runaway slaves funneled into Canada, was known by the codename "Midnight". The Detroit River was colloquially referred to as "Jordan", a biblical allusion to the river of the same name across which the Israelites traveled to reach the Promised Land. Canada, as a terminus along the Railroad's metaphorical tracks, was often referred to as "Dawn", symbolizing the hope and possibility that it represented for so many African-American emigrants.

Those who succeeded in reaching Canada were understandably eager to remain within the country's protective borders. Ergo, many of the Railroad's refugees became enthusiastic volunteers for local militias during periods of conflict. During both the War of 1812 and the 1837 Rebellions, Black Canadians served with distinction at Fort Malden. In 1807, deserters from the black militia of Detroit came to work at Fort Malden and were neither segregated nor denied promotions. Furthermore, the Second Essex Company of Coloured Volunteers "manned Fort Malden from Christmas Day, 1837, until May" and were participants in the capturing of the schooner Anne in 1838.

Fort Malden was thus an embodiment of freedom for those travelling along the Underground Railroad, acting as a gateway, refuge, and even a place of eventual settlement for those journeying into Canada. Today, the town of Amherstburg proudly hosts The North American Black Historical Museum and Cultural Centre Inc, the first black historical site in Canada.

== Tecumseh and the British–Indian alliance ==
In the late 18th century, as a result of American expansion westward into First Nations' territory in the Great Lakes region, many displaced Native peoples traveled from Fort Detroit to Fort Malden. The British offered asylum to those who feared retribution by the Americans after the Battle of Tippecanoe and the Battle of Fallen Timbers, though that was generally where their assistance would end. However, a notable exception to this ambivalent relationship was the military alliance during the War of 1812 between the British at Fort Malden and Tecumseh, chief of the Shawnee People. Canadian novelist John Richardson, who witnessed Tecumseh first-hand at Fort Malden, described the chief as having an "ardor of expression in his eye that could not fail to endear him to the soldier hearts that stood around him." Tecumseh was an advocate for a military alliance between Great Britain and the First Nations of the Great Lakes region as a means of defending against American aggression and expansion into what was at the time the western frontier.

Tecumseh played a significant role in the Siege of Detroit, an event that helped to solidify the alliance between the British and First Nations of the Great Lakes region during the War of 1812. General William Hull, who was in command of Fort Detroit when it was surrendered to the British forces, was mortified at the prospect of Tecumseh's Native warriors invading the fort and attacking its civilian population. Tecumseh was able to capitalize on this fear, and by repeatedly parading his men loudly through a distant clearing outside of Fort Detroit was able to convince General Hull that their numbers were much greater than was the reality. Despite this joint military success, the interests of the British were not entirely aligned with those of their First Nations allies. When Britain's position on the Detroit frontier wavered and General Henry Proctor abandoned Fort Malden, Tecumseh's reaction was that First Nations had been betrayed. On 18 September 1813 General Proctor made it known to the Indian Council that Fort Malden would be abandoned. In Tecumseh's address to Proctor he laments that British dedication would waver in the face of defeat while the First Nations remained committed to the defence of their territory. He outlines the brief history of the First Nations' involvement in the war against the Americans, and scolds the British for what he perceives as cowardice, stating:

You always told us to remain here and take care of our lands. It made our hearts glad to hear that was your wish ... but now, father, we see you drawing back, and we are sorry to see our father doing so without seeing the enemy. We must compare our father's conduct to a fat animal, that carries its tail upon its back, but when affrighted, it drops it between its legs and runs off.

Despite their protests, Tecumseh and his men would follow General Proctor in their retreat from Fort Malden towards Niagara. It was on this route that Tecumseh was killed at the Battle of the Thames on 5 October 1813.

== Major structures and layout ==
Over the course of the nineteenth and twentieth centuries, Fort Malden underwent multiple facelifts, which saw the construction and demolition of many building sites associated with the fort. The present day fort is made up of a handful of buildings that have been restored for preservation and tourism purposes. Each structure is recognized as a Federal Heritage Building based on historical significance, as well as architectural and environmental importance.

=== Hough House ===
The Hough House was originally constructed in late nineteenth century, but has since been restored as a Colonial Revival-style building. The structure showcases exquisite masonry work and wood detailing. The wood shingle roof, stone accents, facades, and Palladian-style windows makes the Hough House the most stylish structure within the fort. The 2 1/2-storey building sits amongst the earthworks, creating an environment that resembles that of a countryside manor. The Hough House is perhaps the most visited site of Fort Malden, largely due to its attractive design, and more importantly the fact that it plays host to a large number of records and archives pertaining to the history of the fort itself.

=== Brick Barracks ===
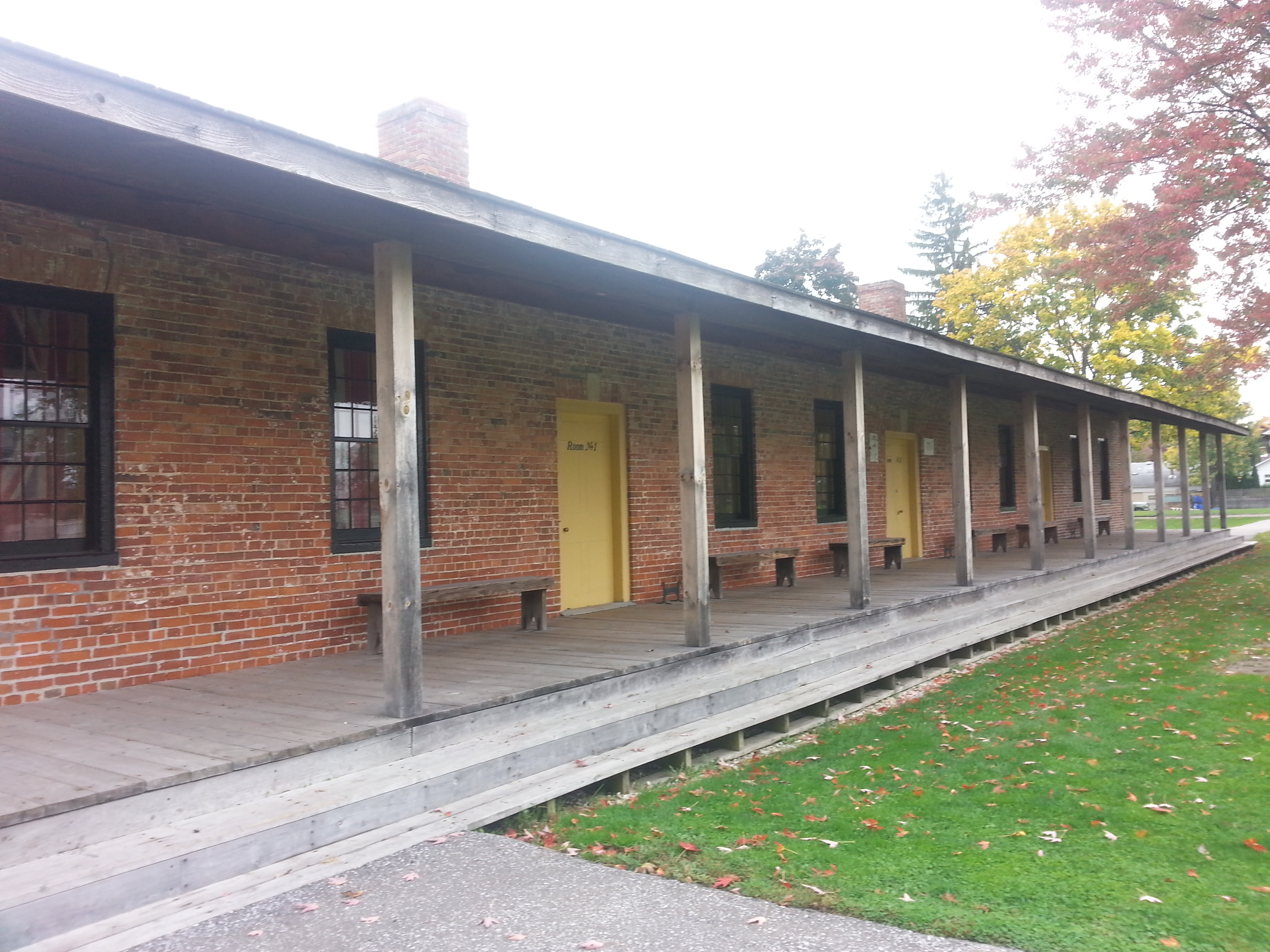
The single-storey Brick Barracks were built in 1820

Due to its location amongst the earthworks of the fort, the barracks has become a centrepiece of Fort Malden. The building was designed based on the simple, standardized military bungalow layout of the 1800s. This prominent building stands out amongst the rest of the fort structures due to its long, rectangular shape, as well as its distinctive red brick exterior. Large bay windows along the entranceway complement the front porch and wooden doors. As this building was part of the restoration process that took place over the late twentieth century, its interior layout has been altered with refinished hardwood floors and additions to all three sections of the core of the building. The restoration also included the reconstruction of chimneys, doors, and windows.

=== Visitor Centre ===
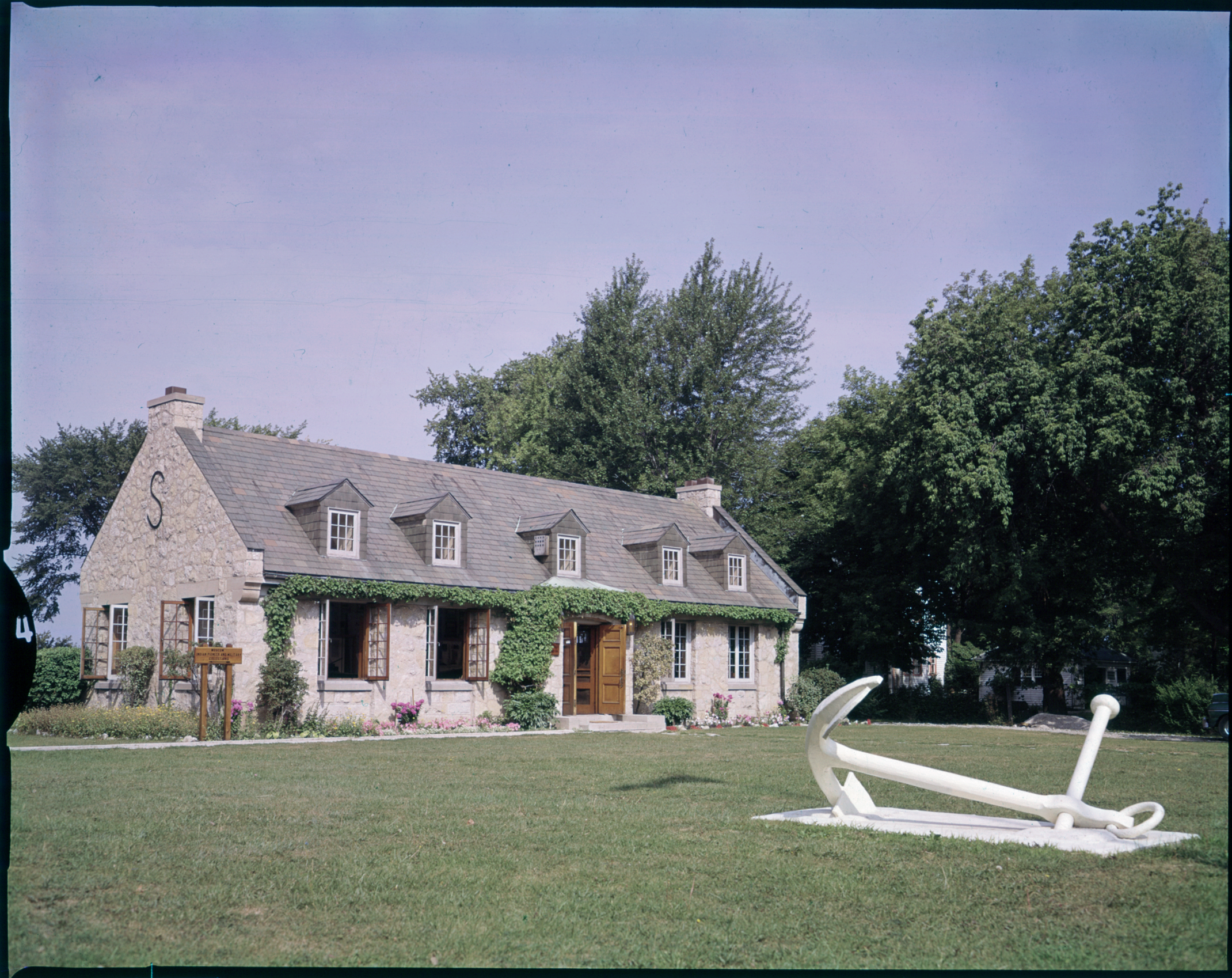
Fort Malden, Amherstburg, 1959

The single-storey building acts the main entrance to the fort, and offers information to visitors and tourists. Originally, the Visitor Centre operated as the museum before exhibits and archives were relocated to the Hough House. Rectangular in shape, the structure was designed to follow the theme of the Colonial Revival style of the other buildings located within the fort, and exhibits a limestone exterior, incorporated with stone chimneys, multi-pane windows, and trimmed rear and frontal gardens.

=== Callam House ===
The Commissariat Office, or Callam House, is one of the few buildings to actually demonstrate a military presence within the area of Fort Malden. The building itself is located within the Amherstburg Navy Yard. It was used primarily as a means to administer service contracts to military members during the mid-nineteenth century. The Callum House resembles the design of the barracks found within Fort Malden; however, unlike the barracks, the Commissariat Office was designed without a verandah. The building underwent a restoration process carried out by Parks Canada in the 1980s, which refurbished much of the original exterior work done by the building's designer, Captain Philpotts of the Royal Engineers. As for the interior, the Parks Canada's restoration team decided to preserve the original layout and design.

=== Amherstburg Navy Yard ===
The Amherstburg Royal Naval Dockyard has been recognized as a separate National Historic Site of Canada. The site located on the outskirts of Fort Malden and overlooks the Detroit River. The original dockyard has been defunct, with the majority of the land becoming privately owned for personal estates. The site was built in 1796, and acted as a supply depot and ship building centre for the British military. Many of the ships used throughout the War of 1812 built and serviced in the navy yard up until its demolition in 1813. The land has since been restored as a community park, and features gardens, gazebos, and recreational areas. Plaques have been erected in different areas of the park as a way to honour the history of the area, as well as acknowledge its existence as being a National Historic Site of Canada.

== Affiliations ==
The Museum is affiliated with: CMA, CHIN, and Virtual Museum of Canada.

== See also ==
- Chronology of the War of 1812
- War of 1812 Campaigns
- List of forts in Canada
- Seven Years' War
- Fort Amherstburg
- Upper Canada
