= Adam Muir (British Army officer) =

British Army officer

- Born: c. 1768; Scotland
- Died: 11 May 1829; William Henry (Sorel)
- Spouse: Mary Elizabeth Alexowina Bender
- Children: 10
- Military career
- Allegiance: British
- Branch: Army
- Rank: Brevet Major
- Unit: 41st Regiment of Foot
- Conflicts: War of 1812
- Awards: Field Officer's Gold Medal (Detroit)
- Other work: Farmer

Brevet Major Adam Charles Muir (c. 1768 – 11 May 1829) was an officer in the British Army, who played a subordinate but important role during the War of 1812 between the United States and the United Kingdom.

== Early life ==
Muir was born in Scotland c. 1768. The actual date has not been established and may have been as early as 1766 or as late as 1770.

== Military career ==
=== Early service ===
Muir enlisted as a private soldier in the 41st Regiment of Foot in March 1788. He quickly rose through the ranks, becoming a sergeant in only five months and later the regiment's sergeant major. He was appointed as the regiment's adjutant in September 1793 and served in that role until 1805. Muir was commissioned an ensign in September 1794 and almost immediately promoted to lieutenant.

In 1793, during the French Revolutionary Wars, the 41st Foot was deployed to the West Indies. The regiment took part in capture of Martinique in March 1794 and the attack on Guadeloupe in April 1794. Muir appears on the prize list for Martinique. From 1794 to 1796, the 41st served in Saint-Domingue (Haiti) aiding French royalists in suppressing the rebellion led by Toussaint Louverture. During the two years in Saint-Domingue the regiment was decimated by disease. The surviving officers and sergeants left for England in August 1796 while the remaining enlisted were transferred to the 17th Regiment of Foot. After arriving in England, the "skeleton" of the regiment was sent to Ireland and began recruiting efforts.

=== Canada ===
In August 1799, the regiment sailed from Ireland to Quebec in Lower Canada aboard the transport Asia. The voyage was marred by an outbreak of typhus that killed 20 aboard ship and an additional 65 once the regiment arrived at Quebec. Leaving the sick behind to receive medical care, the regiment proceeded by bateau up the St. Lawrence River to Montreal. Detachments of the regiment garrisoned a number of forts in the Montreal area in 1800 and 1801.

On August 6, 1801, while stationed in Montreal, Muir married Mary Elizabeth Alexowina Bender. They eventually had six sons and four daughters. Elizabeth, the daughter of Doctor Francois Xavier Benoit and Marguerite Benoit, was born in Montreal in 1785 and died in Saint-Hugues in 1862.

Half of the regiment was posted to Upper Canada in 1802 where they garrisoned Fort York on Lake Ontario, and Fort George and Fort Erie on the Niagara River. The remaining companies and the headquarters staff were posted to Fort St. John on the Richelieu River southeast of Montreal. In 1803, the entire regiment was sent to Quebec and remained there until 1805, when it was posted to Upper Canada. Again, the regiment was split with detachments at multiple posts, including Amherstburg located near the mouth of the Detroit River. Muir, who had been promoted to captain in 1804, was sent to Amherstburg.

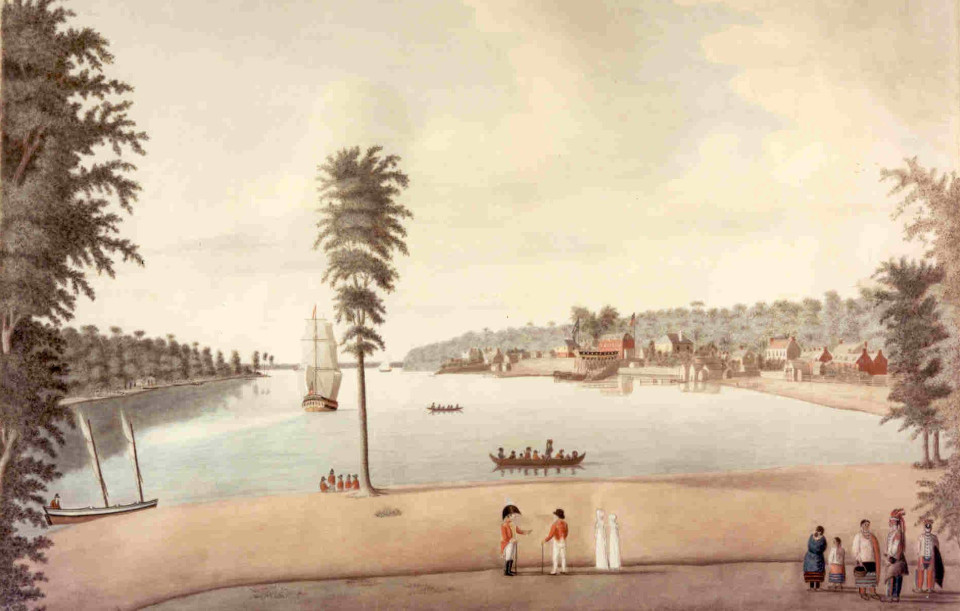
View of Amherstburg, 1812. Watercolour by Catherine Reynolds (1784-1864)

In the years prior to the War of 1812, British officers at Amherstburg and American officers at Fort Detroit informally assisted each other in capturing deserters. Detroit's civilian population, however, opposed the practice. In November 1805, Muir and Ensign John Lundie crossed the river to Detroit in pursuit of a deserter named Morrison. Morrison was arrested with the assistance of a few American officers. A number of civilians intervened, and during the ensuing fracas, Muir struggled with Morrison and accidentally shot himself in the leg. Muir, Lundie and an American officer were arrested but were released on their own recognizance. At their trial in Detroit ten months later, all three were found guilty and given harsh sentences by Judge Augustus Woodward. The sentences included large fines and imprisonment but were significantly reduced upon review to fines of sixteen cents.

In June 1806, Muir was given temporary command of Fort St. Joseph, located on a large island at northwestern end of Lake Huron. Shortly after his arrival, Muir reported that the fort had "never been finished" and was in poor repair.

In the autumn of 1809, the 41st Foot returned to Montreal where it was inspected by Major General Gordon Drummond. Drummond reported "the regiment, considering the detached manner in which it has been quartered for the last four years, is very creditable in its discipline." In September 1811, the 41st Foot returned to Upper Canada with most of the regiment again split between Amherstburg and Fort George.

=== War of 1812 ===
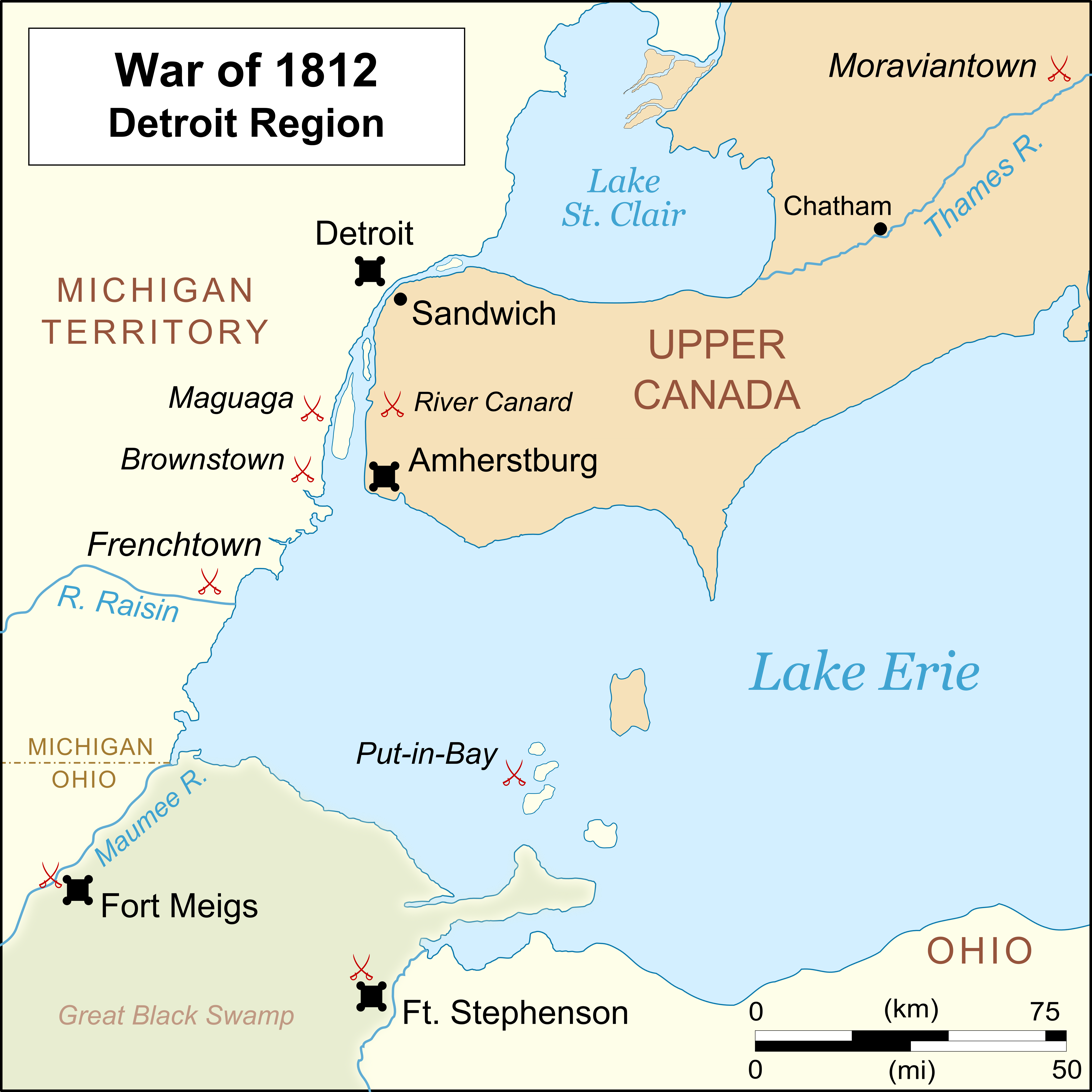
Battles and locations in the Detroit region during the War of 1812

Muir commanded the three companies of the 41st Foot based at Amherstburg when the United States declared war on the United Kingdom on June 18, 1812. Although Amherstburg's garrison was small, there were a significant number of Wyandot, Odawa, Ojibwe, Potawatomi, and Shawnee living in the area; part of a loose confederacy led by the Shawnee war leader Tecumseh.

On 12 July 1812, an American army under Brigadier General William Hull crossed the Detroit River and occupied Sandwich (now Windsor). Hull declined to advance on Amherstburg after his men skirmished with British pickets along the Canard River. On July 26, Colonel Henry Procter arrived to take command at Amherstburg.

In early August, Procter sent Muir with two companies of the 41st Foot across the river to the Wyandot village of Brownstown. Muir's orders were to block the American supply train that was at Frenchtown on the River Raisin waiting for an escort from Detroit. On August 6, an American column commanded by Lieutenant Colonel James Miller set out from Detroit to secure the supply route. To prevent Miller from succeeding, Muir advanced north to the abandoned Wyandot village of Maguaga with 90 regulars and 50 men from the Essex Militia, supported by Tecumseh and his warriors. Once in position, Muir was reinforced by 60 additional regulars who had arrived at Amherstburg that morning. The Battle of Maguaga began late in the afternoon on August 9 when Muir opened fire on the approaching American column. Miller deployed his men into line and advanced under heavy fire. Muir ordered a charge, however, the bugle call was misinterpreted by the newly arrived regulars who began to fall back. As Miller pressed forward his attack, Muir ordered a retreat. Screened by Tecumseh's warriors, the British withdrew back to Brownstown, then crossed the river to Amherstburg. Despite scoring a tactical victory, the Americans suffered 18 killed and 64 wounded. The British had 4 killed, 19 wounded and two taken prisoner. Muir was among the wounded, but recovered sufficiently to lead the men the 41st at the capture of Detroit a week later.

Hull began withdrawing his forces from Upper Canada on August 8. Major General Isaac Brock arrived at Amherstburg with reinforcements on the evening of 13 August. He met with Procter and Tecumseh, and was determined to take offensive action. On 15 August, Brock sent a letter demanding Hull's surrender. When Hull refused, Brock ordered the artillery battery that Procter had established at Sandwich to open fire. Tecumseh and roughly 600 warriors crossed the river that night. On the morning of 16 August, Brock and Procter crossed the river with 330 regulars and 400 militia, and advanced on Detroit.

Despite having a strong defensive position, Hull decided that surrender was the only option. He lacked confidence in his men, believed he was outnumbered, and above all feared "the horrors of an Indian massacre" should he lose. Once the articles of capitulation had been signed, a detachment of the 41st Regiment entered Fort Detroit and raised the Union Jack.

In September 1812, Procter sent Muir with a detachment of regulars and militia to support the Potawatomi besieging Fort Wayne in the Indiana Territory. With Muir were a few hundred Wyandot led by Roundhead as well as Odawa and Ojibwe warriors from Michilamackinac. Procter was unaware that the Potawatomi had ended their siege just before the fort was relieved by forces led by Major General William Henry Harrison. On September 25, as Muir ascended the Maumee River, his Indigenous scouts skirmished with scouts from a brigade led by Brigadier General James Winchester that was advancing down the river from Fort Wayne. After learning that Fort Wayne had been relieved and that he was greatly outnumbered, Muir withdrew back to Maumee Bay and returned to Amherstburg.

Due to serious illness, Muir was not present at the Battle of Frenchtown on January 22, 1813 when Procter soundly defeated the forces led by Winchester that had advanced to the River Raisin.

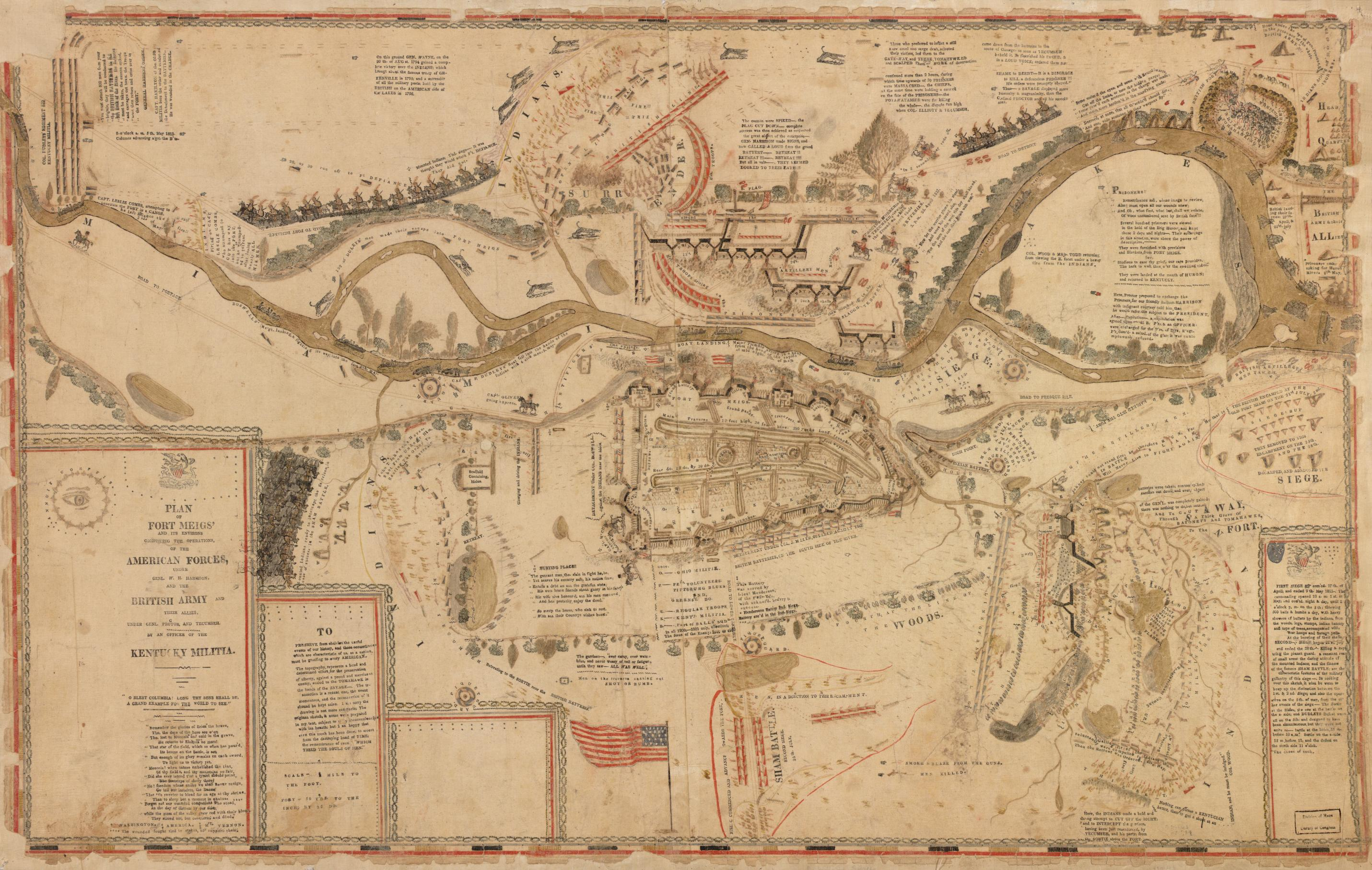
William Sebree's Plan of Fort Meigs and its Environs. Sebree was a captain in the 10th Kentucky Militia.

Muir was with the 41st Regiment at the siege of Fort Meigs in the spring of 1813. Fort Meigs, located on the south side of Maumee River, was a recently constructed fortification that Harrison intended to use as his base for a campaign to recapture Detroit and advance into Upper Canada. After several delays caused by heavy rain, Procter and 533 regulars embarked aboard the vessels of the Provincial Marine on April 23 and sailed across Lake Erie to Maumee Bay. 462 militia followed in bateaux. Tecumseh, who had recently returned to Amherstburg, led roughly 1,200 warriors overland and rendezvoused with Procter on 29 April. Procter established his headquarters at the abandoned Fort Miami. He had Tecumseh lightly invest Fort Meigs while four artillery batteries were established on the north side of the river.

The bombardment began on May 1 but caused little damage due to the traverses that Harrison had ordered constructed inside the fort. The British were unaware that a substantial reinforcement of Kentucky militia led by Brigadier General Green Clay was heading down the Maumee River by flatboat. Harrison dispatched a messenger to Clay with orders to destroy the British batteries. Clay assigned the task to Colonel William Dudley.

On May 4, Dudley surprised and captured the British batteries after landing his regiment on the north side of the river. His orders were to spike the guns then withdraw back to the boats but he failed to adequately brief his subordinates. When a detachment came under fire from Indigenous snipers, Dudley ignored his orders and set off in pursuit with the bulk of his men and was drawn into an ambush.

Muir and Captain Peter Chambers led a counterattack from the British camp. While Chambers stormed the batteries and drove off the militia that had remained there, Muir moved directly to support the Indigenous warriors attacking Dudley. The ambush and counterattack decimated the disorganized Kentucky militia. Of Dudley's 866 officers and men only 150 managed to reach the safety of the fort. The rest were either captured or slain. The battle soon became known as "Dudley's Massacre" or "Dudley's Defeat." Most of Procter's Indigenous allies and some of the militia departed soon after, forcing the British to abandon the siege and return to Amerhersburg.

Muir was again wounded at the Battle of Fort Stephenson in August 1813. Procter had decided to launch an attack on Harrison's supply depot on the Sandusky River. His Indigenous allies, however, led by Tecumseh, insisted on a second attack on Fort Meigs. Tecumseh's warriors staged a mock battle in the woods to make it appear as if they were attacking a relief column in order to lure out the garrison. The ruse failed since the Americans were aware that no reinforcements were expected. Procter quickly abandoned the siege and proceeded east to attack Fort Stephenson. Over the course of two days in early August, the severely outnumbered garrison of roughly 160 men, under the leadership of Major George Croghan, repelled all attacks. The British suffered 96 casualties before Procter withdrew back to Amherstburg.

On September 10, 1813, an American squadron commanded by Oliver Hazard Perry defeated and captured six British vessels at the Battle of Lake Erie. The American victory gave the Americans control of the lake and completely ruptured Procter's supply line. He decided to abandon Amherstburg, Sandwich, and Detroit and withdraw eastward up the Thames River valley. Muir torched Fort Detroit on Procter's orders and brought its garrison across the Detroit River. On the morning of September 27, the 41st Regiment marched away from Sandwich. Later that afternoon, Harrison landed his force three miles (5 km) below Amherstburg and advanced to Sandwich the next day. On October 2, Harrison set off in pursuit of Procter and Tecumseh.

The British retreat up the Thames River valley was slow due to bad roads and incessant rain. Proctor was rarely with his men during the retreat and often failed to share his plans with his subordinates. Years later, "an anonymous British officer" claimed that Muir was one of several officers who became critical of Procter's leadership at this time. Muir is alleged to have said that Procter should be hanged.

Harrison caught up with Procter west of Moraviantown in the afternoon of 5 October. Procter had his infantry form lines in an open wood between the riverbank and a forested swamp. Muir was assigned command of the reserve line. A single artillery piece was positioned astride the road. Due to the lack of tools, the British were unable to construct defensive works such as an abatis that would impede Harrison's mounted troops.

Procter was vastly outnumbered. Most of his artillery had been sent ahead to Moraviantown along with the sick and wounded leaving just 451 regulars to face the Americans. Harrison had close to 3,000 men: five regiments of Kentucky militia, a mounted regiment led by Colonel Richard Johnson, 120 regulars from the 27th Infantry and several light artillery pieces.

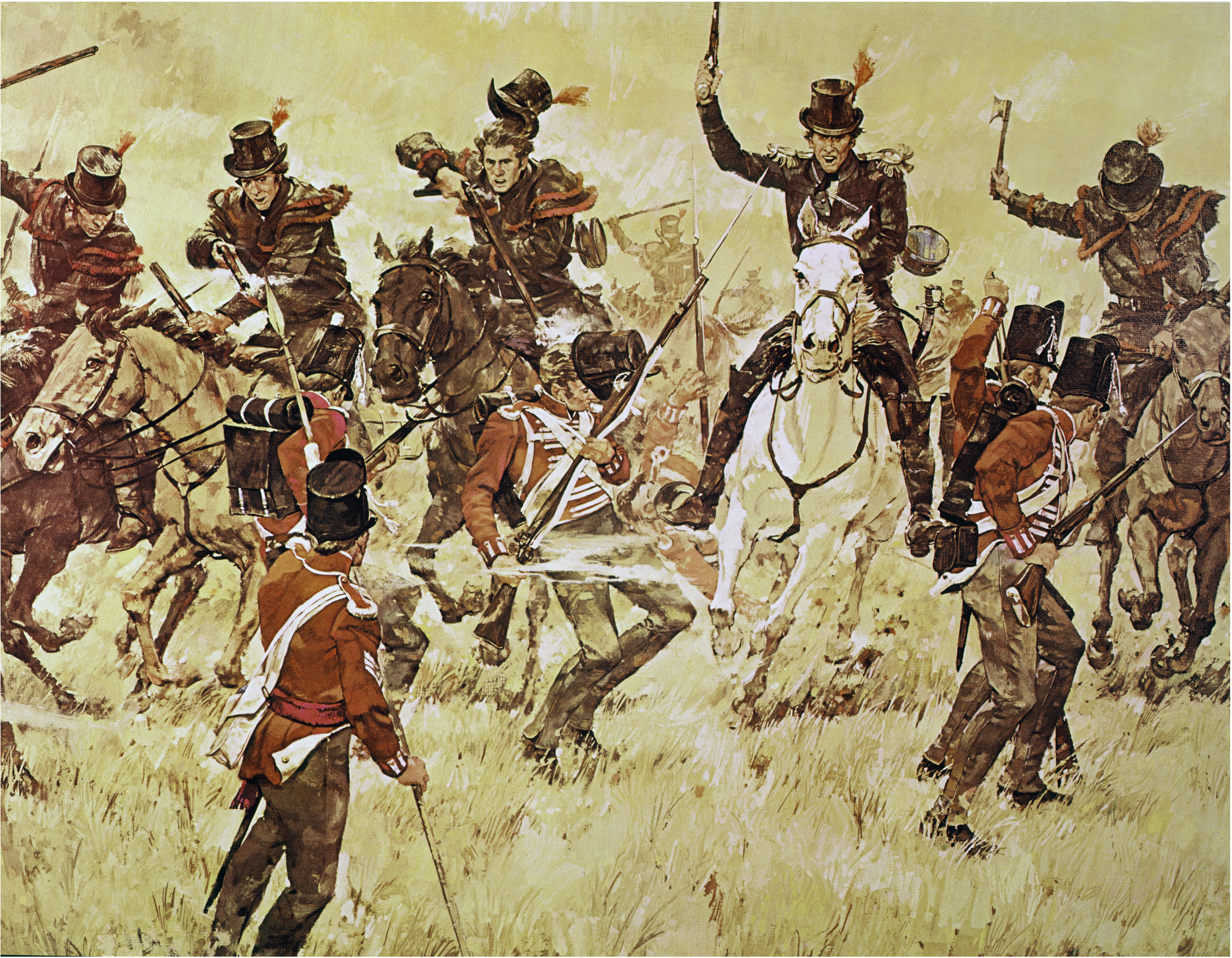
Remember the River Raisin! by Ken Riley (1919-2015). Johnson's mounted infantry charge the British line at the Battle of the Thames

Johnson's riders charged the British lines shouting "Remember the Raisin!" The British loosed a ragged volley, however, the artillery piece failed to fire before its position was overrun. The Americans hit the British line and forced it to give way. Procter attempted to rally his men but Johnson's mounted infantry easily pushed through the second line before swinging around to attack from the rear. The ferocity of the attack caused Muir and most of the British to surrender. Only Procter and about 50 others managed to escape the battlefield.

The British prisoners were escorted under guard to Detroit and then overland to Fort Meigs. Some of the officers, however, were taken across Lake Erie to Fort Stephenson where they joined the prisoners taken at the Battle of Lake Erie. Both groups were then marched to Chillicothe and eventually to Frankford, Kentucky. While enlisted prisoners were accommodated in a fortified camp on the outskirts of the town, the officers found themselves victims of a series of retaliations involving prisoners of war between the United States and Britain, and were held for several months in close confinement in the Kentucky Penitentiary.

Muir was repatriated through a prisoner exchange several months before the bulk of the prisoners returned to Upper Canada in September 1814. In June 1814, he was brevetted a major and assigned to the militia in the Grand River area.

In the fall of 1814, Brigadier General Duncan McArthur led a large-scale raid into Upper Canada from Detroit. On November 5, McArthur reached Brant's Ford on the Grand River. Muir led a small force of militia accompanied by a detachment of the 19th Light Dragoons and a number of Indigenous warriors who had gathered on the east bank of the ford to contest the crossing. After a brief exchange of gunfire, McArthur decided not to risk forcing a passage. Instead he headed south, intending to burn settlements along the north shore of Lake Erie.

== Post-war activities ==
After the war ended, Muir was awarded the Field Officer's Gold Medal for his participation in the capture of Detroit and received a share of the prize money. In June 1815, the 41st Regiment departed Canada for Europe. Arriving too late to participate in the Battle of Waterloo, the regiment briefly formed part of the Army of Occupation before returning to the United Kingdom. Muir seriously injured his hip after a fall from his horse in Ireland in 1816. Two years later he resigned his commission and was given a modest pension. He returned to Lower Canada where he had received a grant of land in Saint-André-Est northwest of Montreal. He struggled financially and was eventually forced to sell his land and retire to an invalid hospital in Sorel, then known as William-Henry, where he died in 1829.
