= Siege of Fort Meigs =

Siege during the War of 1812

Coordinates: 41°33′9″N 83°39′2″W

- Part of the War of 1812 and Tecumseh's War
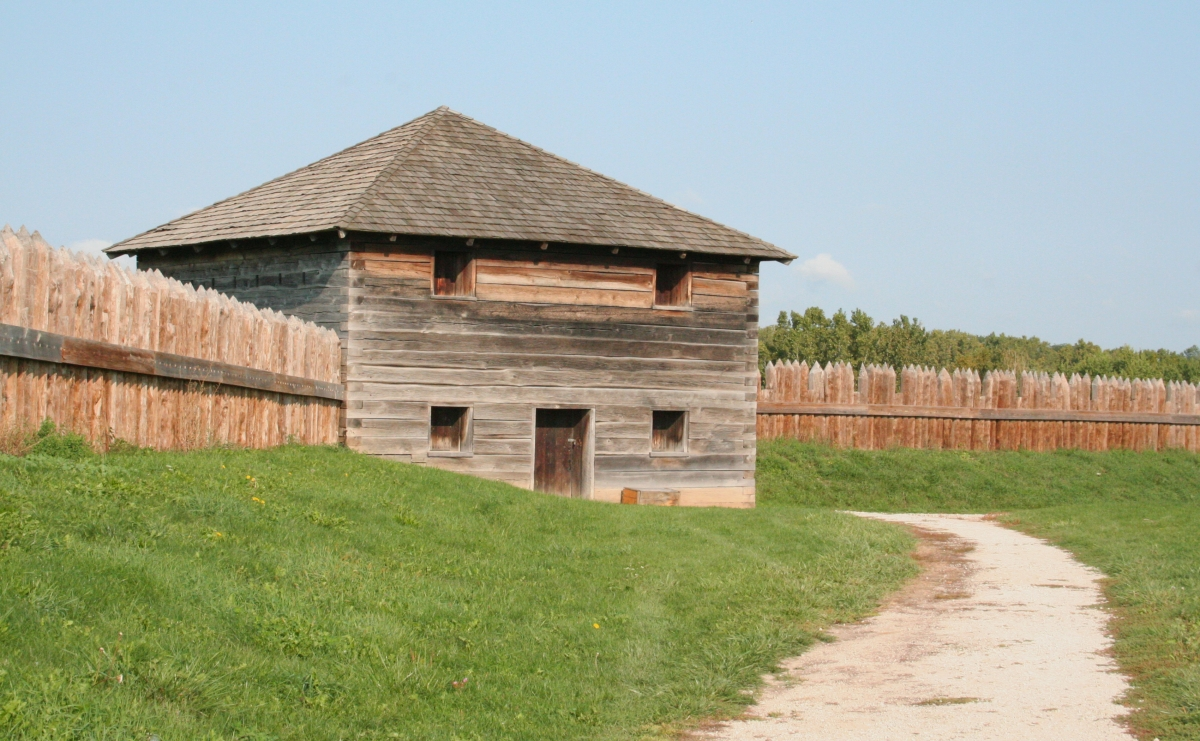
- A reconstructed blockhouse at Fort Meigs Historic Site, Perrysburg, Ohio
Date	April 28 – May 9, 1813 (1 week and 4 days)
Location	Present-day Perrysburg, Ohio
Result	American victory

Belligerents
United Kingdom; Tecumseh's confederacy	United States

Commanders and leaders
(United Kingdom of Great Britain and Ireland) Henry Procter; Tecumseh; Roundhead	(United States) William H. Harrison (United States) Green Clay (United States) William Dudley †

Strength
1,200 Indigenous; 522 British regulars 462 Canadian militia	2,400 regulars and militia

Casualties and losses
British; 14 killed 47 wounded 41 captured Indigenous; 19 killed and wounded Total: 121	161 killed 189 wounded 627 captured Total: 977

The siege of Fort Meigs was a significant War of 1812 military engagement in northwestern Ohio during the spring of 1813. British regulars and militia led by Brigadier General Henry Procter, supported by Indigenous forces led by Tecumseh, attempted to capture the recently constructed fort in order to forestall Major General William Henry Harrison's campaign to retake Detroit and invade Upper Canada. An American attempt to relieve the fort on May 5 resulted in heavy casualties, however, Procter was unable to breech Harrison's defences and withdrew after a 11-day siege.

== Background ==
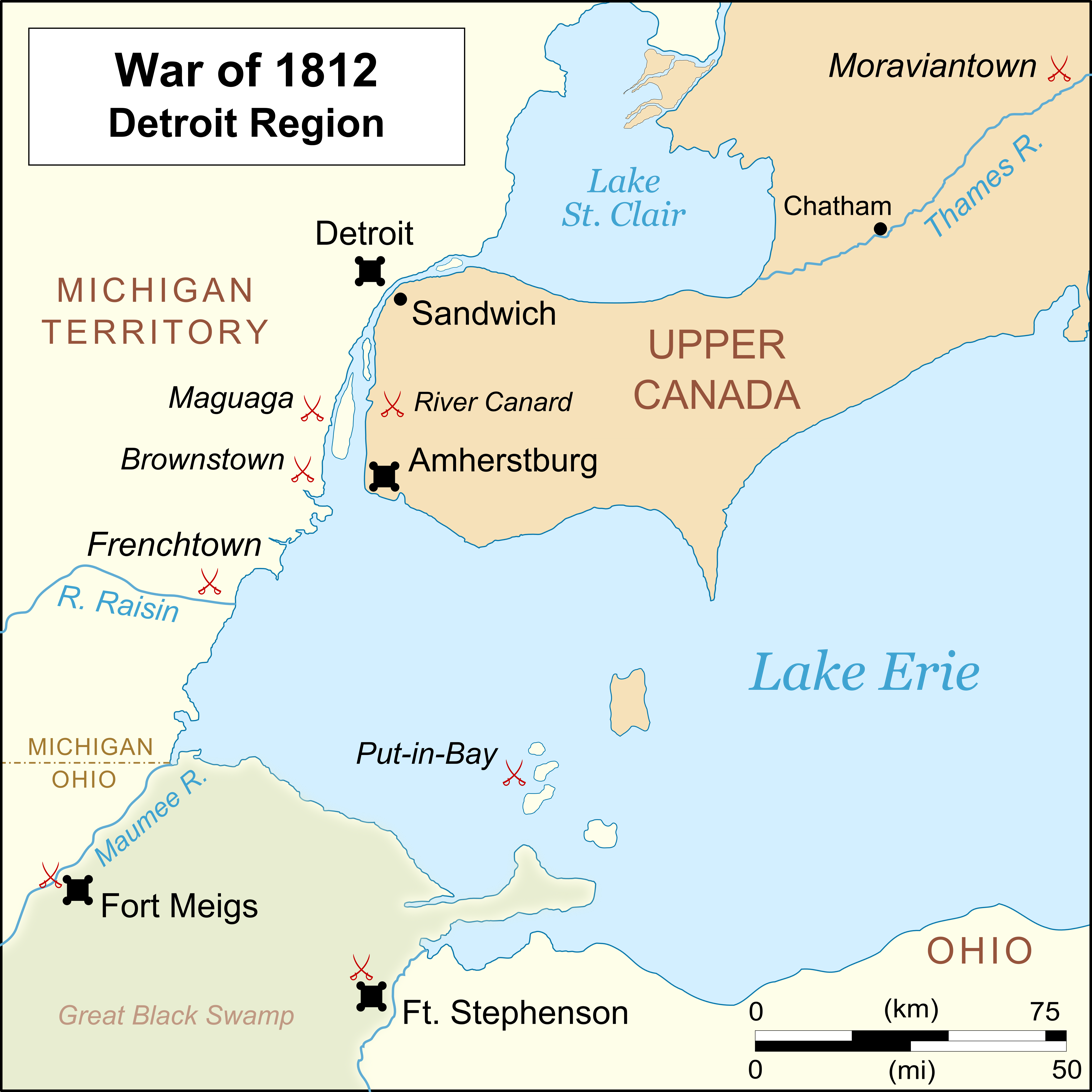
Map of forts and battles in the Detroit region during the War of 1812

In August 1812, Brigadier General William Hull surrendered Detroit, the Michigan Territory and most of the Army of the Northwest to British forces led by Major General Isaac Brock. In order to recover Detroit and advance into Upper Canada, the Americans quickly moved to rebuild. William Henry Harrison, then governor of the Indiana Territory, was given command of the Army of the Northwest by President James Madison and accepted a commission as a major general in the regular army.

Harrison initially planned a winter campaign but his advance was hampered by bad weather and a shortage of supplies. On January 22, 1813, the wing of his army commanded by Brigadier General James Winchester was defeated at the Battle of Frenchtown. Harrison had been en route to Frenchtown with supplies and reinforcements when news of Winchester's defeat reached him. He withdrew back to the Maumee River, ordered Winchester's stores at the rapids burned, then pulled his soldiers further back to the Portage River. Harrison returned to the rapids at the beginning of February and began construction of Fort Meigs, named after Return J. Meigs Jr., the Governor of Ohio.

Fort Meigs was situated on the southeast side of the Maumee River slightly above the foot of the rapids. Across the river were the ruins of the old British Fort Miami and the site of the 1794 Battle of Fallen Timbers. Designed by Captains Charles Gratiot and Eleazer Wood of the Army Corps of Engineers, it would be the largest wooden stockaded fort ever built in the United States. The fort sat atop a 40 foot (12 m) embankment that sloped down to the river. A fifteen-foot earth and log palisade linked seven blockhouses and five elevated batteries, and encompassed an area of almost 10 acres (4.0 ha).

In early March, Harrison dispatched a strike force led by Captain Angus Langham of the 19th Infantry to cross frozen Lake Erie and conduct a hit-and-run attack against the British naval yard at Amherstburg in Upper Canada. Langham's detachment of 168 regulars and militia crossed the ice to South Bass Island but discovered that the lake was open to the north. Langham returned to Lake Erie's south shore and reported the expedition's failure to Harrison.

The number of men working on the fort steadily declined as those who had joined the militia immediately after Hull's defeat reached the end of their six-month terms of enlistment. Harrison had left for Cincinnati to coordinate recruiting efforts, leaving Brigadier General Joel Leftwich of the Virginia militia to supervise construction. Work ground to a halt and much of the timber that had been cut for pickets and blockhouses was used as firewood. Work resumed when Captain Wood, who had been on the Sandusky River overseeing construction at Fort Stephenson, returned to Fort Meigs and restored discipline. Leftwich subsequently disobeyed orders by departing for his home in Virginia when his men's terms of enlistment expired.

In April, the British Army commander at Amherstburg, Brigadier General Henry Procter, began preparations to attack the fort. Harrison became aware of Procter's preparations, and returned to Fort Meigs in mid-April with reinforcements, increasing the strength of the fort to 1,200 men. Earlier, he persuaded Isaac Shelby, the Governor of Kentucky, to call up a brigade of 1,200 Kentucky militia under Brigadier General Green Clay. Clay split his brigade into two regiments, the first commanded by Lieutenant Colonel William Boswell, the second by Lieutenant Colonel William Dudley. The brigade left Lexington on March 31, and crossed the Ohio River to Cincinnati on April 6, but failed to reached Fort Meigs before it was besieged.

== Siege begins ==
After several delays caused by heavy rain, Procter and 522 regulars from the 41st Regiment of Foot, the Royal Newfoundland Regiment of Fencible Infantry and the Royal Artillery embarked aboard the vessels of the Provincial Marine on April 23 and sailed across Lake Erie to Maumee Bay. 462 militia followed in batteaux. Tecumseh and the Wyandot chief Roundhead led roughly 1,200 Wyandot, Shawnee, Potawatomi, Odawa, and Ojibwe warriors overland and rendezvoused with Procter on 29 April.

Procter established his headquarters at the abandoned Fort Miami. He tasked Tecumseh with lightly investing Fort Meigs while four artillery batteries were established on the north side of the river. On the night of April 30, one of Procter's two gunboats fired 30 rounds at the fort before withdrawing. The following morning, two 24-pounder guns, three 12-pounder guns, an 8 inch howitzer, two 5½-inch howitzers, two 5½-inch mortars, and both gunboats opened fire on the fort.

The bombardment caused little damage due to the extensive earthworks that Harrison had ordered constructed inside the fort. Harrison had his artillery return fire but his supply of ammunition was limited and the shelling had little effect. On 3 May, Procter sent a letter to Harrison demanding the surrender of Fort Meigs in order to prevent the "effusion of blood." Harrison replied, "Tell General Proctor that if he shall take the fort it will be under circumstances that will do him more honor than a thousand surrenders." After this refusal, Procter had an additional battery placed on the south side of the river 300 yards (270 m) east of the fort.

== Dudley's defeat ==
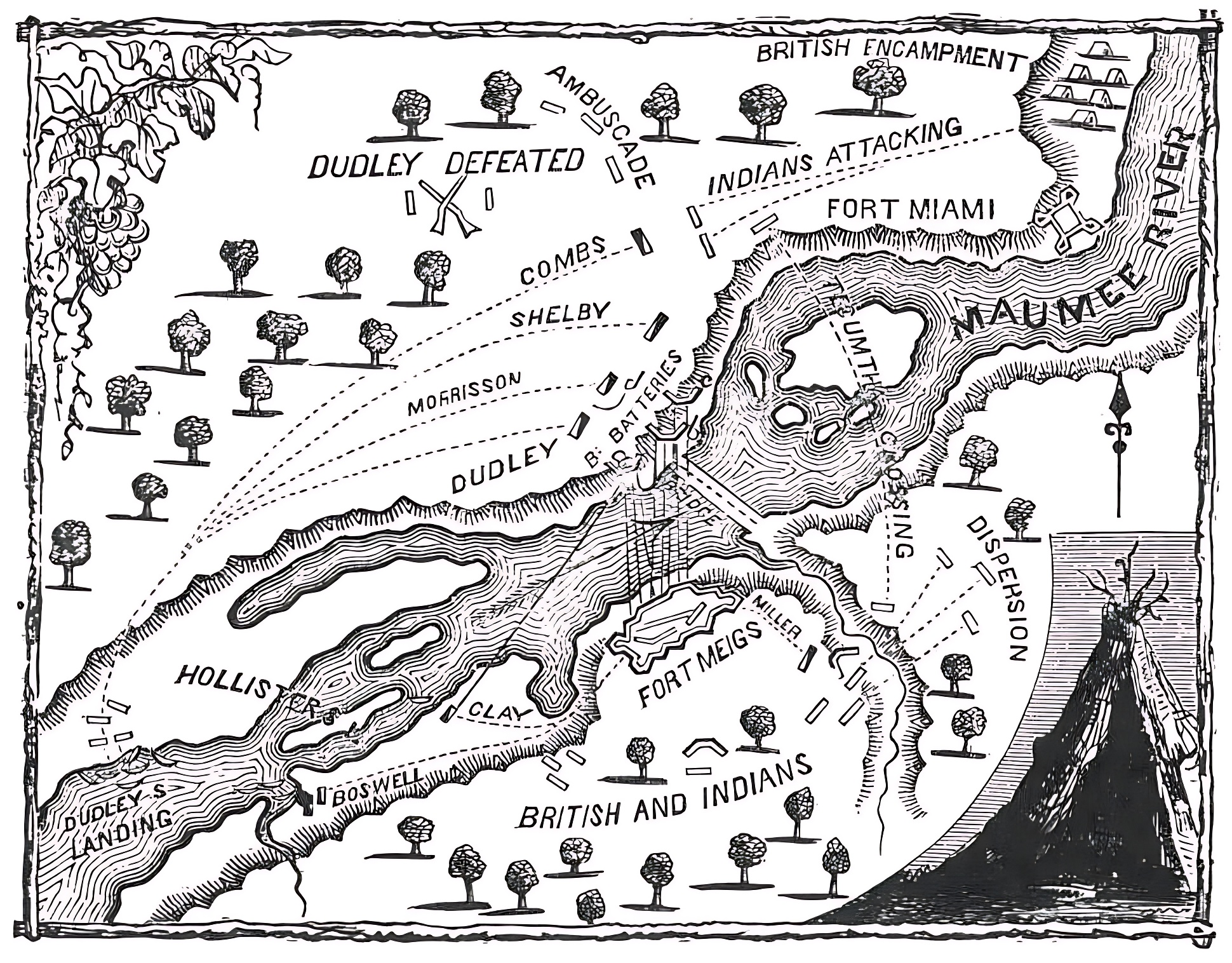
Plan of the Battle of 5 May, from Benson J. Lossing's Pictorial Field Book of the War of 1812

Dudley's regiment reached Fort Winchester at the confluence of the Maumee and Auglaize rivers on April 29. Clay arrived there with Boswell's regiment on May 3 and was briefed by Captain William Oliver who had been dispatched by Harrison. Both regiments boarded flatboats the following morning and by nightfall were within 18 miles (29 km) of Fort Meigs. Oliver returned to Fort Meigs and reported Clay's position to Harrison. Harrison sent another messenger back to Clay with orders to divide his force. 400 men were to land on the south side of river and fight their way into the fort. The remaining 800 men were to land on the north side of the river and destroy the British guns. They would then return to the boats, cross the river, and proceed to the fort. Meanwhile a sortie from the fort would disable the British battery to the east.

Clay selected Dudley to lead the attack on the British batteries. With Dudley were 761 men from his own regiment, 60 from Boswell's regiment and 45 regulars. Dudley landed without opposition. The British gunners fled as Dudley's men stormed the gun emplacements and cut down the British colours. Attempts to disable the guns failed as the iron spikes that were needed were aboard Clay's boat on the opposite side of the river. Because Dudley had neglected to adequately brief his officers, no attempt was made to return to the boats. When Dudley's scouts came under intense fire from Indigenous warriors in the woods, Dudley moved to reinforce them but was soon drawn into an ambush. Some accounts, however, state that the Kentucky militia set out without orders and that Dudley followed his men in an attempt to bring them back.

Major James Shelby found himself in command of the men that had remained near the British guns. Three companies of British regulars and one of militia quickly launched a counterattack to retake the batteries. While Captain Peter Chambers engaged Shelby, Captain Adam Muir moved in support of the Indigenous warriors fighting against Dudley. Shelby's men managed a single volley before they broke and ran. In the woods, Dudley was killed, and the disorganized Kentucky militia was decimated in confused fighting. Of Dudley's 866 officers and men only 150 managed to reach the safety of the fort. The rest were either captured or slain. The battle soon became known as "Dudley's Massacre" or "Dudley's Defeat".

After landing on the south side of the river, Clay and Boswell faced some resistance from Indigenous warriors as they advanced towards Fort Meigs. Harrison ordered his dragoons and a company of infantry to sortie and conduct the men to safety. Clay and Boswell reached the relative safety of fort but suffered 20 dead and 45 wounded in the attempt.

The American attack against the British battery to the east succeeded. Colonel John Miller, at the head of 350 regulars and militia, overran the battery, spiked the guns, and took 41 prisoners. Miller's detachment, however, suffered heavy casualties when two companies of the 41st Foot, two companies of militia and several hundred Indigenous warriors counterattacked and, in hard fighting, drove Miller's detachment back to the fort.

=== Aftermath ===
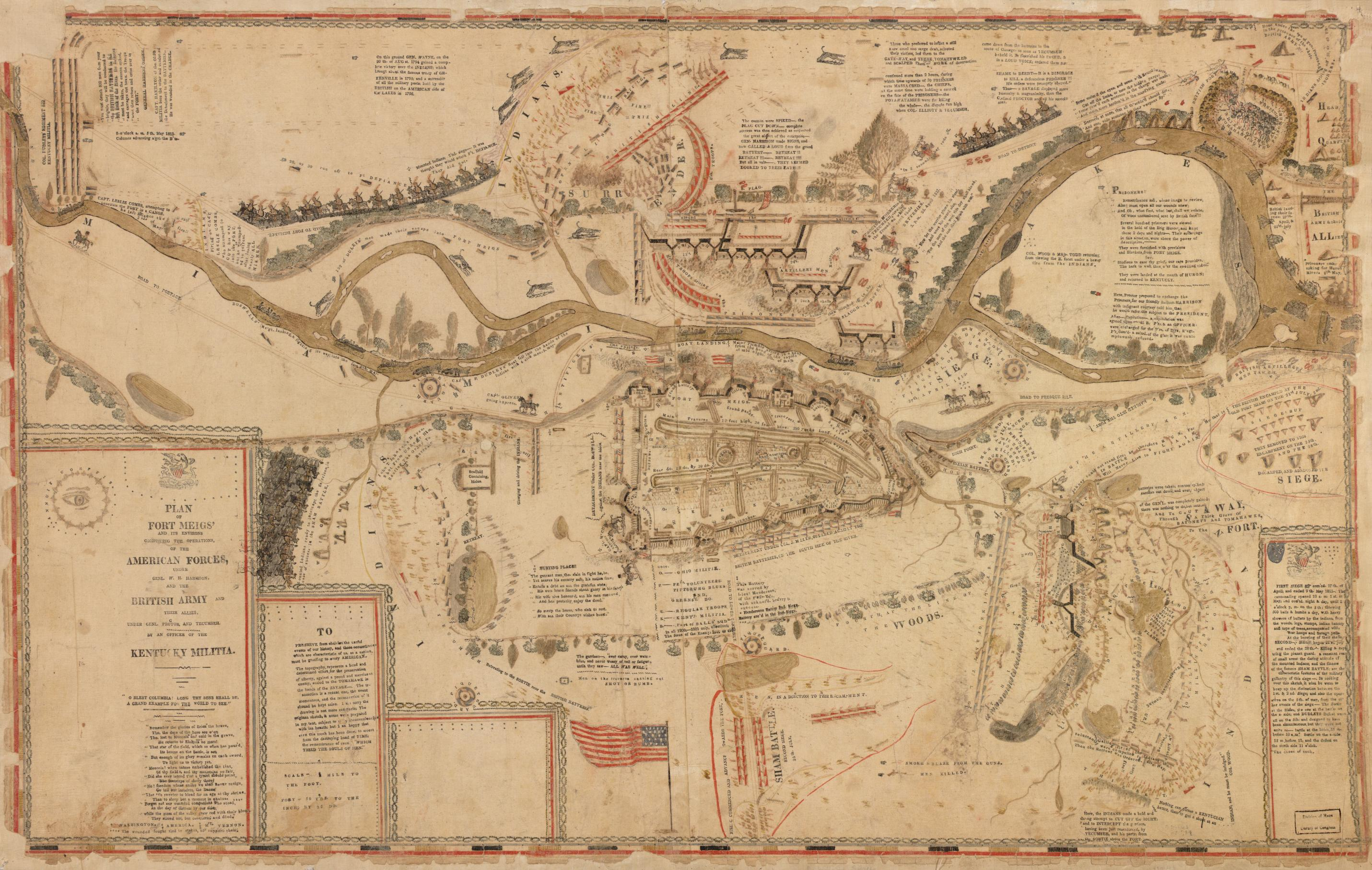
William Sebree's Plan of Fort Meigs and its Environs. Sebree was a captain in the 10th Kentucky Militia.

After the battle, most of the prisoners from Dudley's command were taken to the ruins of Fort Miami near the British camp. According to a few accounts, the prisoners were made to "run the gauntlet" before they were turned over to the British. Although a guard had been posted, a group of Ojibwe and Potowatomi who had not been in the battle began attacking the prisoners. Several Americans and a British guard were killed before Tecumseh and Matthew Elliott of the British Indian Department stopped the slaughter. Tecumseh is alleged to have demanded Procter explain why he had not prevented the massacre. When Procter replied that the Indigenous warriors could not be made to obey, Tecumseh supposedly replied, "Begone! You are unfit to command. Go and put on petticoats". Another version of the incident had Tecumseh rebuking Procter with, "I conquer to save; you to kill". Eyewitness accounts state that between 12 and 14 prisoners were killed in the massacre.

By nightfall all the prisoners had been secured aboard the Provincial Marine vessels anchored at the mouth of the Maumee River. Several hours later Procter received a letter from Harrison proposing a prisoner exchange. Procter and Harrison met the following morning and arranged for 21 American prisoners to be swapped for the British soldiers captured when the artillery position east of the fort was overrun.

== End of the siege ==
On 7 May, terms were arranged providing for the exchange of prisoners from regular units, and the parole of militia prisoners who pledged to perform no further military service until they were formally exchanged. On the same day, Procter's artillery resumed fire, but most of the Indigenous warriors had drifted away sated with plunder, and the Canadian militia were anxious to get back to their farms and begin spring planting. The renewed bombardment had little effect, and Fort Meig's garrison now outnumbered the besiegers. Procter abandoned the siege on 9 May.

== Casualties ==
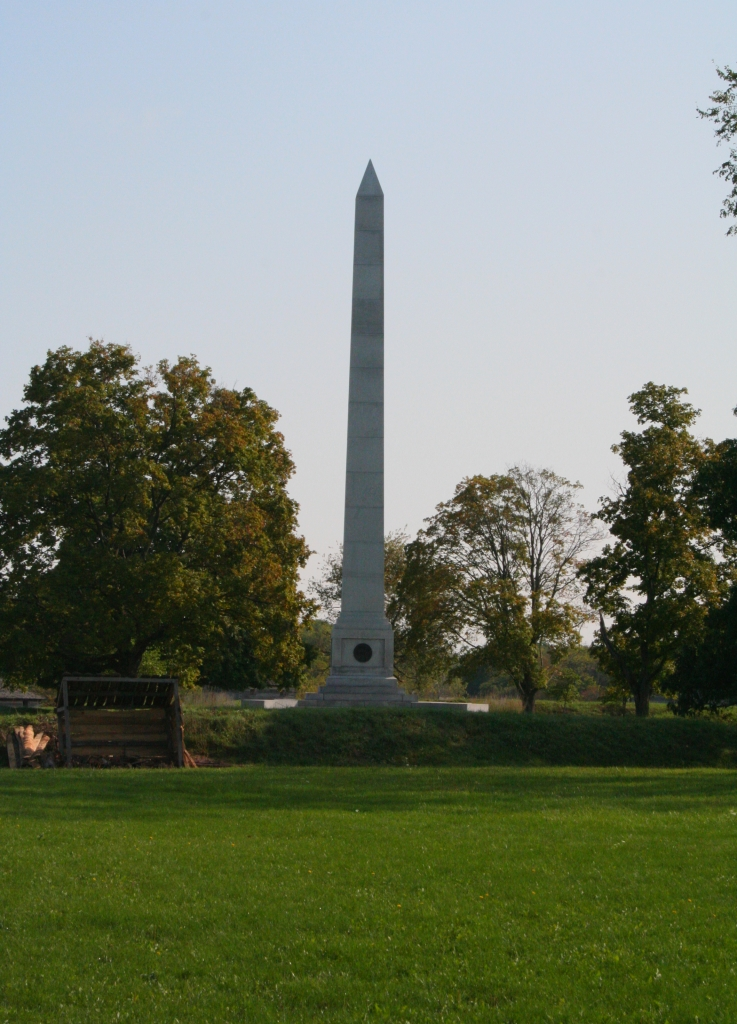
The War of 1812 memorial obelisk at Fort Meigs Historic Site

The British official casualty return for May 5 reported 14 killed, 47 wounded and 41 captured. Included among the wounded was Captain Laurent Bondy of the Essex militia who was injured by artillery fire on May 3 but later died of his wounds. Britain's Indigenous allies had at least 19 killed and wounded.

Harrison reported the casualties sustained by his garrison for the entire siege, from 28 April to 9 May, as 80 killed and 190 wounded. He reported no men missing or captured from the garrison. 12 were killed and 20 wounded by artillery fire which suggests that 69 were killed and 170 wounded during the fighting on the south side of the river on 5 May. A casualty report for Dudley's command, compiled after the militia prisoners were paroled, records that 80 men were killed and 100 wounded. An official British return of prisoners records 547 Americans captured but a note from Procter states that "since the above return was made out more than eighty prisoners have been brought by the Indians." While there are discrepancies, the total American loss may have been 160 killed, 190 wounded, and 627 captured including 100 wounded prisoners: a total of close to 1000 casualties.

== Order of battle ==
British/Indigenous order of battle	American order of battle
British Army: Brigadier General Henry Procter: Royal Artillery; 41st Regiment of Foot; Royal Newfoundland Regiment of Fencible Infantry; Upper Canada Militia: 1st Regiment Essex Militia; 2nd Regiment Essex Militia; 1st Regiment Kent Militia; Tecumseh's Confederacy: Shawnee: Tecumseh; Wyandot: Roundhead; Potawatomi; Odawa; Ojibwe; British Indian Department: Matthew Elliott	Army of the Northwest: Major General William Henry Harrison: Fort Meigs; Engineer: Captain Eleazer D. Wood; Quartermaster: Colonel William Christy; United States Light Dragoons: Major James V. Ball; 2nd United States Artillery: Major Amos Stoddard (died of wounds); 17th Infantry Regiment: Captain George Croghan, Captain William Bradford; 19th Infantry Regiment: Colonel John Miller; Elliott's Company: Captain Wilson Elliott; Langham's Company: Captain Angus L. Langham; Nehring's Company: Captain Abel Nehring; Gwynne's Company: Captain David Gwynne; 10th Kentucky Militia (Detachment); Sebree's Company: Captain William Sebree; Duvall's Company: Captain John Duvall; Baker's Company: Captain John Baker; 1st Regiment Ohio Militia: Colonel James Mills; 2nd Regiment Ohio Militia: Colonel Mills Stephenson; Independent Volunteer Battalion: Major John B. Alexander; Pittsburgh Blues: Captain James Butler; Petersburg Volunteers: Captain Richard McRae; Kentucky Militia Brigade: Brigadier General Green Clay; 10th Kentucky Militia: Colonel William E. Boswell; 13th Kentucky Militia: Colonel William Dudley †; Captain John C. Morrison †; Captain James Shelby; Price's Light Artillery Company: Captain Samuel Price

== Second siege ==
Once the British had withdrawn, Harrison left Clay in command of the fort with about 2000 militia. In July 1813, Procter decided to raid Fort Stephenson on the Sandusky River. His Indigenous allies, however, led by Tecumseh, insisted on a second attack on Fort Meigs. Tecumseh's warriors staged a mock battle in the woods to make it appear as if they were attacking a relief column in order to lure Clay out of the fort. Clay, however, knew no reinforcements were coming, and the ruse failed. Procter abandoned the siege and proceeded east to attack Fort Stephenson. Over the course of two days in early August, the severely outnumbered garrison of roughly 160 men, under the leadership of Major George Croghan, repelled all attacks. The British suffered 96 casualties before Procter withdrew back to Amherstburg.

== Legacy ==
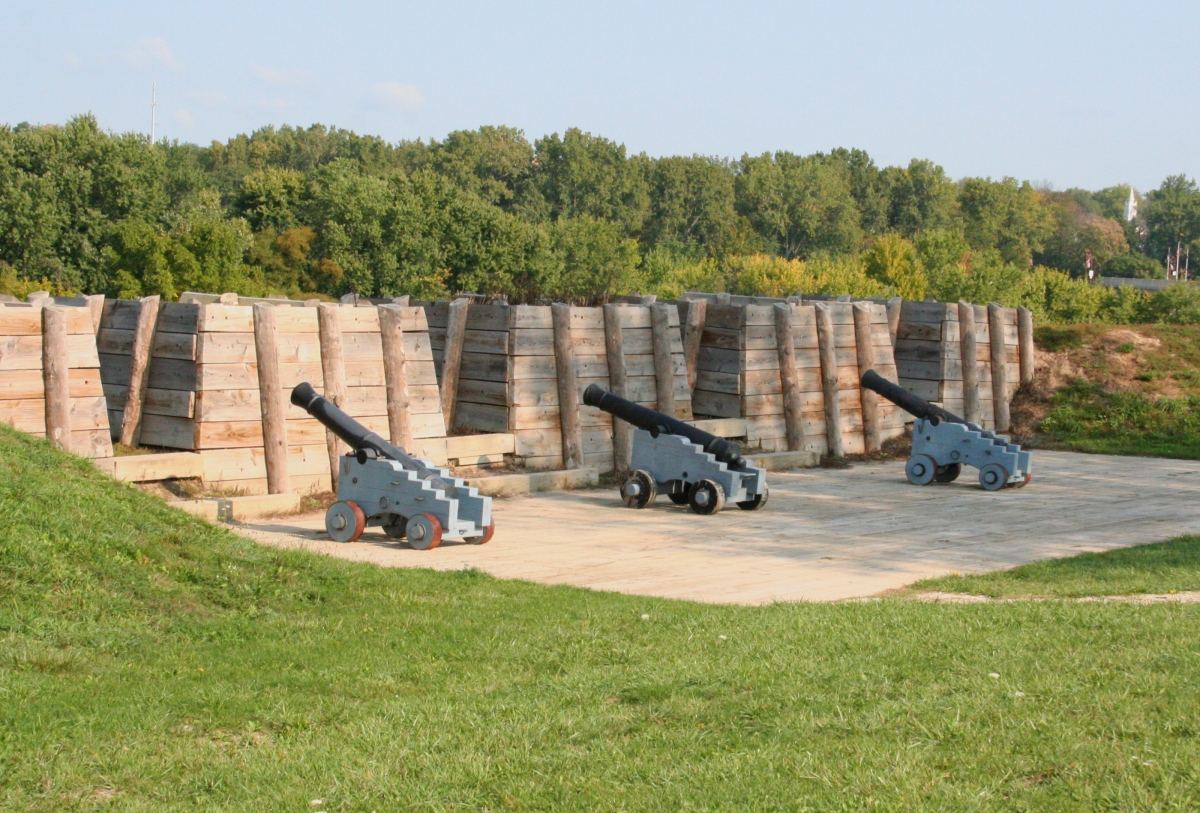
Artillery at Fort Meigs Historic Site, Perrysburg, Ohio

The British referred to the engagement on May 5 as the "Battle of the Miami" because the Maumee River had traditionally been known as the "Miami du Lac" or "Miami of the Lake." The 41st Regiment of Foot, whose successor in the British Army is the Royal Welsh Regiment, was awarded the battle honour, "Miami", in commemoration of its participation in the siege.

In the Canadian Army both the Royal Newfoundland Regiment and the Essex and Kent Scottish Regiment carry the battle honour "Maumee" to commemorate the participation of their ancestor units in the campaign.

Five infantry battalions of the United States Army (1-3 Inf, 2-3 Inf, 4-3 Inf, 2-7 Inf and 3-7 Inf) perpetuate the lineage of the old 17th and 19th Infantry Regiments, which had substantial detachments that were engaged at Fort Meigs.

In 1908 an 82 feet (25 m) granite obelisk was constructed to commemorate the siege and the estimated 825 soldiers who died during the fort's existence.

The Ohio History Connection began a reconstruction of Fort Meigs in the late 1960s and opened the site to the public in 1974. A multi-million dollar renovation, started in 2000, included the building of a Museum and Education Center and the reconstruction of the fort's blockhouses.
