= Siege of Detroit =

Early battle in the War of 1812

Coordinates: 42.3300°N 83.0487°W

- Part of the War of 1812 and Tecumseh's War
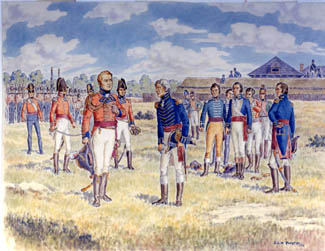
- The Surrender of Detroit, by J.C.H. Forster
Date	15–16 August 1812
Location	Detroit, Michigan Territory
Result	British–First Nations victory
Territorial changes	British occupation of the Michigan Territory

Belligerents
United Kingdom; Upper Canada; Tecumseh's confederacy	United States

Commanders and leaders
Isaac Brock; Tecumseh	William Hull (surrendered)

Strength
330 regulars 400 militia 600 Indigenous; 5 field guns 2 ships	589 regulars 1,606 militia 1 brig

Casualties and losses
None	7 killed 2,188 captured

The siege of Detroit, also known as the surrender of Detroit or the Battle of Fort Detroit, was an early engagement in the War of 1812. A British force under Major General Isaac Brock in cooperation with Indigenous warriors under Shawnee leader Tecumseh used bluff and deception to intimidate American Brigadier General William Hull into surrendering the fort and town of Detroit, the Michigan Territory, and his army which actually outnumbered the victorious British and Indigenous warriors.

The British victory reinvigorated the militia and civilian population of Upper Canada, who had previously been pessimistic and affected by pro-American agitators. Many Indigenous tribes in the Old Northwest were inspired to take up arms against the Americans. The British held Detroit for more than a year before their naval squadron on Lake Erie was defeated at the Battle of Lake Erie which forced them to abandon the western frontier of Upper Canada.

== Background ==
=== American plans and moves ===
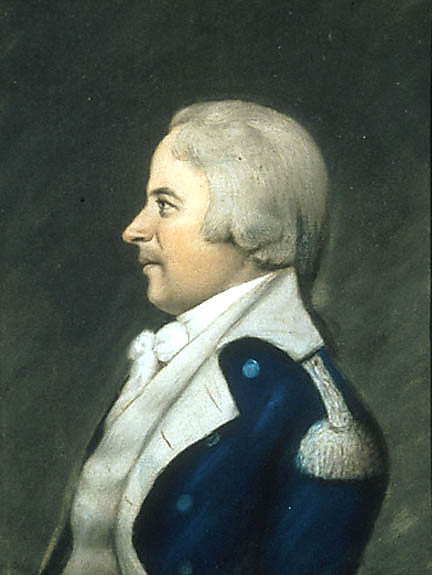
American forces during the siege of Detroit were commanded by Brigadier General William Hull, an aging veteran of the American Revolutionary War.

As tensions between the United Kingdom and the United States grew in the early months of 1812, William Hull, the governor of the Michigan Territory, urged President James Madison and Secretary of War William Eustis to "rapidly and sharply reinforce" Detroit which would secure the Old Northwest against Indigenous tribes who were being incited by British agents to attack frontier settlements. Detroit, founded by the French in 1701, was home to about 700 people who occupied 160 houses surrounded by a palisade. Fort Detroit, built by the British during the American Revolutionary War, was located on high ground above the town but had only a small garrison. It was suggested that should war be declared, an army from Detroit might cross the Detroit River and occupy the Western District of Upper Canada, where support could be expected from recent immigrants from the United States who had been attracted by the offer of generous land grants.

Madison and Eustis concurred with this plan and offered command to Hull, an aging veteran of the Revolutionary War. Hull was reluctant to take the appointment, but no other officer with his prestige and experience was available. He accepted after repeated pleas from Madison and was commissioned as a brigadier general in the United States Army. His army initially consisted of three regiments of Ohio militia under Colonels Lewis Cass, Duncan McArthur, and James Findlay. Hull took command of his army at Dayton, Ohio on 25 May but found that they were poorly equipped and ill-disciplined, and no arrangements had been made to supply them on the march. He made hasty efforts to remedy the deficiencies in equipment.

At Urbana, Ohio, Hull was joined by the 4th Infantry Regiment, commanded by Lieutenant Colonel James Miller. From Urbana, Hull forged a new road to Detroit across the Great Black Swamp of northwest Ohio. On 26 June he received a letter from Eustis, dated 18 June, warning him that war was imminent and urging that he should make for Detroit "with all possible expedition." His draft horses were worn out by the arduous march, so when he reached the mouth of the Maumee River, he put his entrenching tools, medical supplies, officers' baggage, despatches, some sick men and the army's band aboard the schooner Cayahoga, to be transported across Lake Erie.

Hull was unaware that the same day Eustis has written his letter, Congress had passed a declaration of war against the United Kingdom. A second letter with this vital information did not reach Hull until 2 July. In Upper Canada, Major General Brock received the news of the declaration on June 26 and immediately sent word to Amherstburg at the mouth of the Detroit River, and to the British outpost at St. Joseph Island on Lake Huron. On 2 July, the unsuspecting Cayahoga was captured near the mouth of the Detroit River by HMS General Hunter, a Provincial Marine brig under Lieutenant Frédérick Rolette.

When Hull reached Detroit on 5 July, he was reinforced by detachments of the Michigan Territory Militia, including the 140 men of the Michigan Legionary Corps, which Hull had established in 1805. The Americans, however, were short of supplies, especially food, as Detroit's inhabitants could provide only soap and whisky. Nevertheless, Eustis urged Hull to cross the river and capture Amherstburg. The fort there was defended by about 300 British regulars, mainly from the 41st Regiment of Foot but including 50 from the Royal Newfoundland Fencible Regiment, roughly 400 Indigenous warriors, and a detachment of the Essex militia. The post's commander was Lieutenant Colonel Thomas St. George, who was later replaced by Colonel Henry Procter of the 41st Regiment. Hull was not enthusiastic and wrote to Eustis that "the British command the water and the savages." Nevertheless, Hull crossed into Upper Canada on 12 July and occupied Sandwich (now Windsor). He issued proclamations which were intended to induce the inhabitants to join or support his army while some of his mounted troops raided up the Thames River as far as Moraviantown. These moves discouraged many of the militia from opposing his invasion, but few actively aided him, even those who had recently moved from the United States.

There were several indecisive skirmishes with British pickets along the Canard River north of Amherstburg. Hull decided that he could not attack the British fort without artillery, which could not be brought forward because the carriages had decayed and needed repair.

=== British moves ===
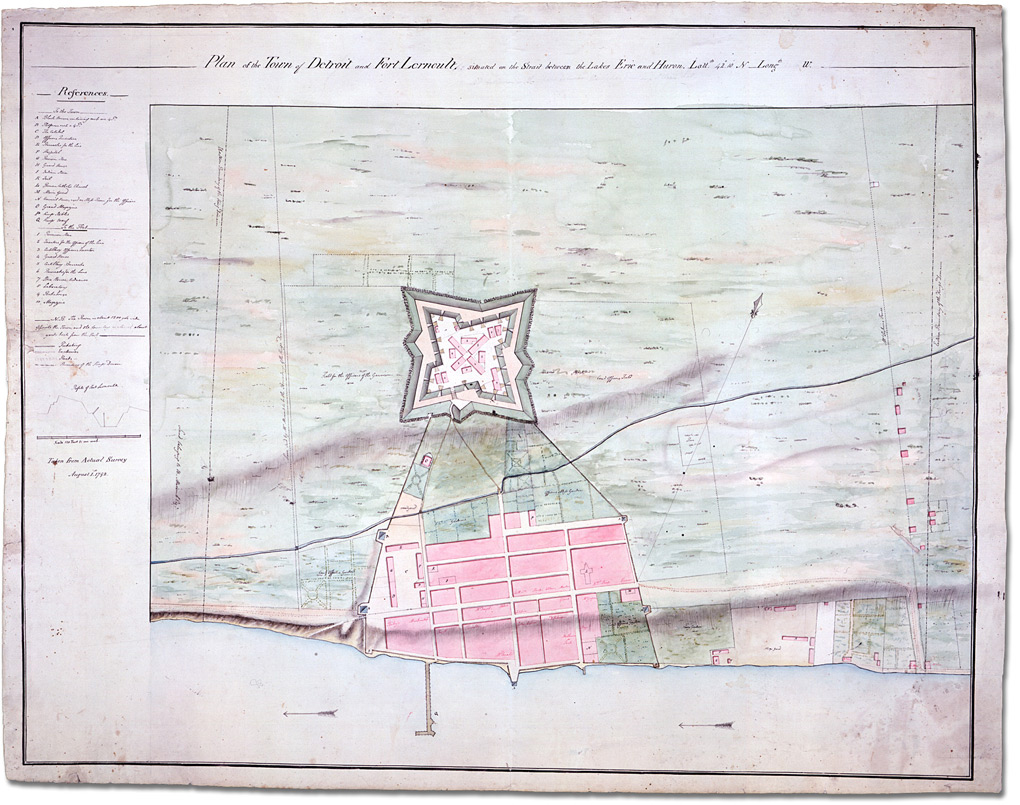
Plan of Detroit and its fort, 1792

On 17 July, a mixed force of British regulars, Canadian fur traders, and Indigenous warriors captured the important trading post of Mackinac Island on Lake Huron from its small American garrison who were not aware that war had been declared. Many of the Indigenous warriors who had taken part in the attack either remained at Mackinac or returned to their homes, but 100 or more Sioux, Menominee, and Winnebago moved south from Mackinac to join those already at Amherstburg. The news of the capture of Mackinac induced the previously neutral Wyandot living near Detroit to become increasingly hostile to the Americans. Hull learned of the capture of Mackinac on 3 August, when the paroled American garrison reached Detroit by schooner. He feared that this had "opened the northern hive of Indians."

Hull's supply lines ran for 60 miles (97 km) along the Detroit River and the shore of Lake Erie, which was controlled by the Provincial Marine, making them vulnerable to British and Indigenous raiders. A war party under Tecumseh ambushed and routed an American detachment under Major Thomas Van Horne on 4 August at the Battle of Brownstown, capturing more of Hull's despatches. Hull sent a larger party under Lieutenant Colonel Miller to clear his lines of communication and escort a supply convoy of 300 head of cattle and 70 pack horses loaded with flour, which was waiting at Frenchtown. Miller forced a British and Indigenous force under Major Adam Muir of the 41st Regiment of Foot to retreat during the Battle of Maguaga on 9 August. Miller declined to press the attack which allowed the British to withdraw back across the river to Amherstburg. Miller was ill and his losses in the engagement were heavier than those of the British. He remained encamped near the battlefield until Hull ordered him to return to Detroit on 11 Aug.

Hull had begun withdrawing his forces back across the river on August 8. Several of his officers disagreed with the withdrawal and secretly discussed removing him from command. Hull had been quarrelling with his militia colonels since taking command, and he felt that he did not have their support in the field or at their councils of war.

Major General Isaac Brock met with Tecumseh in Amherstburg, Ontario and quickly established a rapport, ensuring that the Shawnee chief would cooperate with his plans.

Meanwhile, British Major General Isaac Brock was in York, the provincial capital, dealing with the recalcitrant Legislative Assembly and mobilizing the province's militia. He had at his disposal only a single regiment of regulars and some small detachments of veterans and artillery to support the militia. Brock was aware that there was no immediate threat from the disorganized and badly supplied American forces on the Niagara River, or from the lethargic American commander-in-chief, Major General Henry Dearborn at Albany, New York. Hull alone was occupying or threatening Canadian territory. After finally obtaining support from the Assembly for his measures to defend Upper Canada, Brock (acting under his authority as the lieutenant governor of the province) prorogued parliament and set out on 6 August for Fort Amherstburg with 50 regulars of the 41st Foot and 150 volunteers from the York Militia (the "York Volunteers"). He was later joined by detachments of the Lincoln, Oxford, and Norfolk militias, and by John Norton with 60 warriors from the Six Nations of the Grand River. Travelling in boats along the north shore of Lake Erie in inclement weather, Brock reached Fort Amherstburg on 13 August.

Upon his arrival Brock quickly established a rapport with Tecumseh, ensuring that the Shawnee chief would cooperate with his plans. Tecumseh is said to have turned to his warriors and proclaimed, "Here is a man!" In a subsequent letter Brock wrote that "a more sagacious and a more gallant Warrior does not I believe exist." Brock learned from captured dispatches and letters that Hull's army suffered from a lack of supplies, that morale was low, and that they feared the Indigenous warriors who were allied with the British. Against the advice of most of his subordinates, Brock decided that immediate attack on Detroit was warranted.

== Battle ==
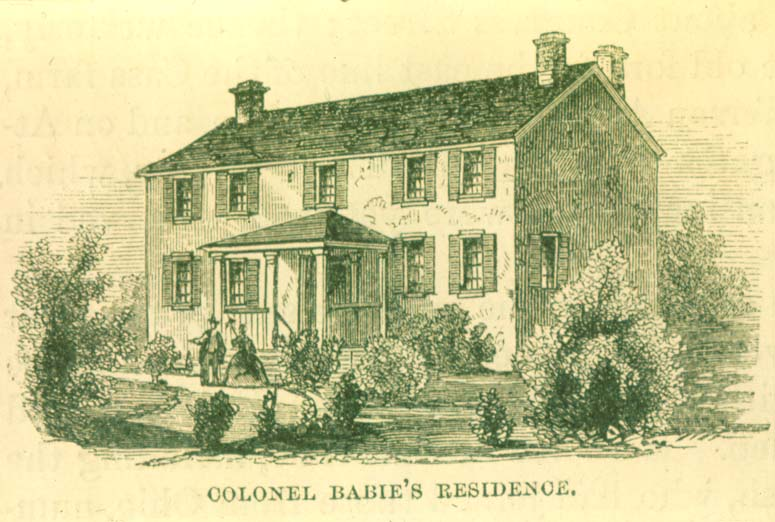
The Francois Bâby house, in the grounds of which the British set up their battery to fire on the American fort

On 15 August, Brock sent his aide-de-camp, Captain John Glegg, under a flag of truce to Fort Detroit with a letter demanding Hull's immediate surrender. In the letter, Brock warned that he would not be able to restrain his Indigenous allies once the attack started:

It is far from my inclination to join in a war of extermination, but you must be aware that the numerous body of Indians who have attached themselves to my troops will be beyond my control the moment the contest commences.

Hull refused, replying, "I am prepared to meet any force which may be at your disposal...”

A few days earlier, after Hull had withdrawn back across the Detroit River, Colonel Procter had ordered the construction of a battery at Sandwich opposite Detroit and on the grounds of the François Baby House, formerly Hull's headquarters. The battery consisted of one 18-pounder, two 12-pounders and two 5½-inch mortars manned by gunners from the Provincial Marine. Brock ordered the artillery to open fire once Glegg returned with Hull's reply. Hull's artillery returned fire without effect, and the guns of both sides fell silent as darkness fell. Tecumseh and about 600 warriors, accompanied by British Indian Department officers, crossed the river that night. Shortly after sunrise, Brock crossed without opposition a few miles downriver of Detroit. With him were 250 men of the 41st Foot, 50 from the Royal Newfoundland Regiment, 30 from the Royal Artillery with five field guns, and 400 militia. Brigade Major Thomas Evans had suggested that Brock have the militia wear cast-off red tunics supplied by the regulars, making it appear from a distance as if his force consisted entirely of professional soldiers. The artillery at Sandwich resumed their bombardment as Brock crossed the river, joined by the guns of the Provincial Marine warships HMS General Hunter and HMS Queen Charlotte.

Tecumseh and Brock viewing Fort Detroit

Brock's original intent was to occupy a position astride the American supply line and wait for the bombardment and a shortage of food to force the Americans to either surrender or come out to fight. He was aware that a day earlier, Hull had sent a detachment of 400 men led by Cass and McArthur to escort a supply convoy to Detroit. Although Hull sent messengers to recall the detachment, Cass and McArthur ignored the order. Tecumseh informed Brock that the detachment was encamped about three miles to the south. To avoid the possibility of being caught between two enemy forces, Brock advanced immediately against the fort. The British column proceeded up the road along the river towards the town before turning inland. The column passed through a field and orchard before forming a line facing the west side of the fort. Meanwhile, Tecumseh's warriors moved through the woods to the north of the fort giving the impression of much larger numbers. In his later report to the Secretary of War, Hull wrote: "The bands of savages which had then joined the British forces, were numerous beyond any former example."

Following his initial refusal to surrender, Hull had become increasingly despondent. He was responsible not only for his soldiers but also for hundreds of civilians including his daughter and grandchildren. He lacked confidence in his men, believed he was outnumbered, and above all feared a massacre should he lose. Despite having a strong defensive position, Hull ordered his artillery not to return fire. After several soldiers were killed during the British bombardment, Hull decided that surrender was the only option.

Around 10:00 a.m., without consulting his officers, Hull had a white bed sheet hung over the side of the fort's southwestern bastion. Brock dispatched his aides Lieutenant Colonel John Macdonell and Captain Glegg to negotiate terms. He warned that the assault would begin in three hours if the Americans did not surrender first. An hour later, Macdonell and Glegg returned with the signed articles of capitulation. Hull surrendered Detroit, the Michigan Territory, and his entire command, including the detachment led by Cass and McArthur. Brock's soldiers marched into the town and lined the road leading to the fort's gate. The American regulars and militia marched out of the fort and stacked their arms. A company of the 41st Foot entered the fort, lowered the Stars and Stripes and raised the Union Jack.

== Casualties and losses ==
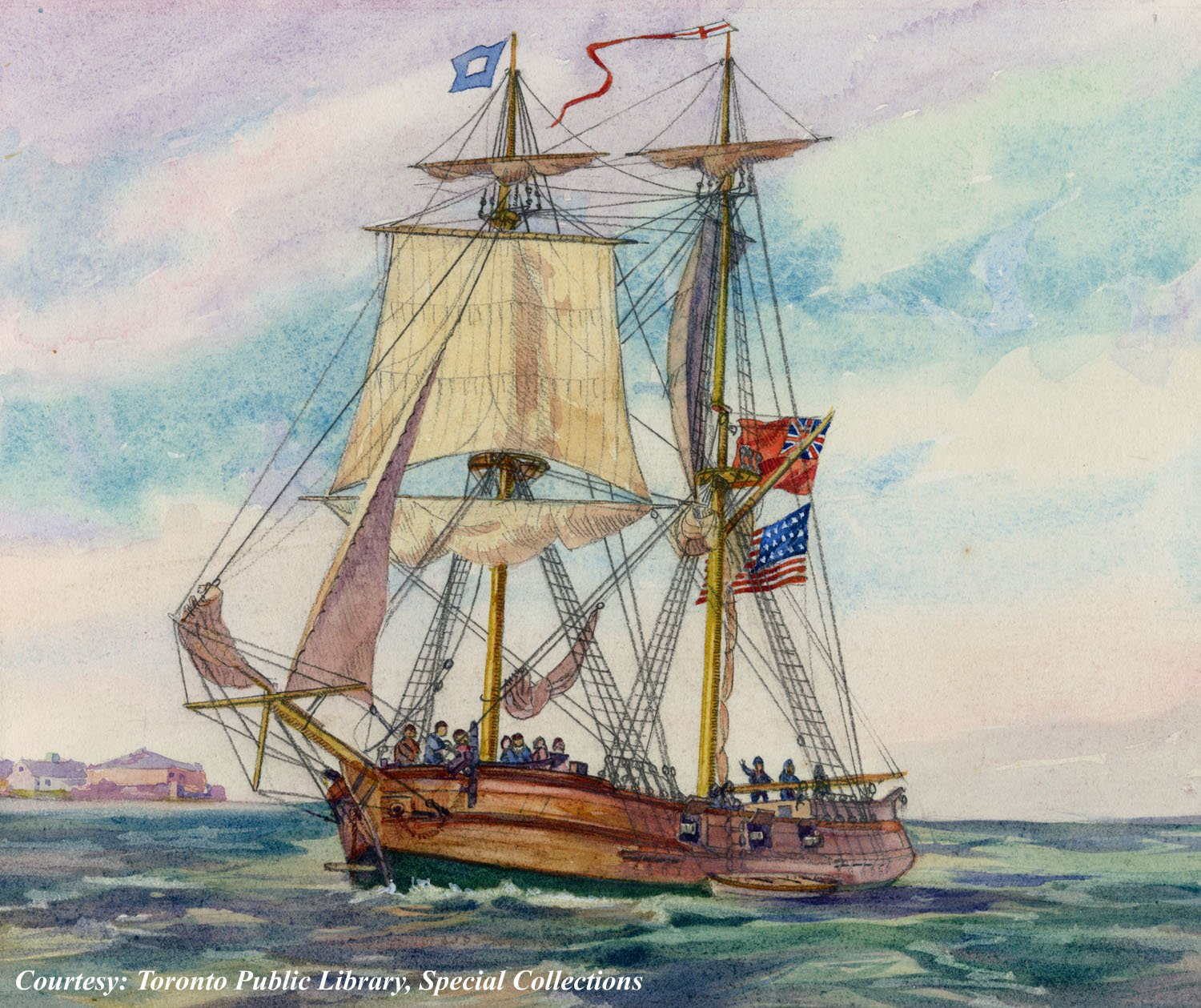
Adams on Lake Erie immediately after British forces captured her at the end of the siege

The British artillery bombardment killed seven American regulars, including Lieutenant Porter Hanks, the former commander of Fort Mackinac who was awaiting court-martial. Hull and 582 regulars were sent to Quebec as prisoners of war, while the 1,606 militiamen captured by the British were paroled and escorted home. Hull was later exchanged, but faced court-martial in January 1814, charged with treason, cowardice and neglect of duty. He is reported to have said: "I have done what my conscience directed — I have saved Detroit and the Territory from the horrors of an Indian massacre." Hull was found guilty and sentenced to death, but his sentence was remitted by President James Madison.

The British captured a considerable amount of munitions at Detroit including 2,500 muskets and bayonets, 500 rifles, 35 artillery pieces and 69 barrels of gunpowder. The muskets, bayonets and rifles were used to better equip Upper Canada's militia. Also taken were the colors of the 4th United States Infantry Regiment and the 6-gun American brig Adams, the latter of which was commissioned into the Provincial Marine as HMS Detroit.

== Aftermath ==
Portrait of Tecumseh attributed to Owen Staples, based on an engraving published by Benson John Lossing in 1868.

Hull's surrender was a "colossal disaster for the United States." The fall of Detroit damaged American morale and neutralized a significant threat to Upper Canada. At the same time, the victory boosted the morale of Upper Canada's regulars, militia and civilian population. The victory solidified the support of Tecumseh and other Indigenous leaders, who saw Brock's actions as both a sign of competence and a willingness to take action. Tecumseh trusted and respected Brock. Although Brock's correspondence indicates a certain amount of paternal condescension for Indigenous people, he seems to have regarded Tecumseh quite highly. Brock made a number of commitments to the Shawnee leader. He promised not to broker a peace treaty with the Americans without addressing Tecumseh's vision of an independent homeland. There is no evidence Brock negotiated in bad faith. His personal integrity and respect for Indigenous people suggests that if Brock had not died two months later he would have kept his word to the Shawnee leader.

Emboldened by the victories at Mackinac and Detroit, Indigenous warriors besieged Fort Wayne and Fort Harrison in the Indiana Territory, and massacred 24 settlers at Pigeon Roost. Brock departed Amherstburg for Fort Erie on 17 August leaving Procter is charge of the Detroit frontier. Brock wished to follow his success at Detroit with a preemptive attack across the Niagara River, but was thwarted by an armistice arranged by Governor General Sir George Prevost. The brief armistice gave the Americans time to reinforce the Niagara frontier before launching an invasion in October. Brock was killed at the ensuing Battle of Queenston Heights while leading a counterattack against a captured British artillery battery.

In September 1812, Brigadier General William Henry Harrison was appointed to succeed Hall as commander of the Army of the Northwest. His instructions were to retake Detroit, but waited until he felt he had sufficient men and supplies. In January 1813, Harrison began moving against Amherstburg and Detroit, but withdrew back across the Maumee River after the column commanded by Brigadier General James Winchester was defeated by Procter at the Battle of Frenchtown. In early May, Procter and Tecumseh unsuccessfully besieged Harrison at the newly constructed Fort Meigs, hoping to forestall an American offensive against Detroit. On 10 September 1813, an American squadron led by Oliver Hazard Perry captured the British squadron on Lake Erie at the Battle of Lake Erie. With his supply route severed, Procter abandoned Detroit and Amherstburg, and with Tecumseh, began a withdrawal up the Thames River. Procter and Tecumseh were overtaken by Harrison at Moraviantown and were soundly defeated at the Battle of the Thames, where most of Procter's regulars were captured. Only 246 escaped, including Proctor. Tecumseh and an unknown number of his warriors were killed.

=== Memorials ===
The 41st Regiment of Foot (perpetuated by the Royal Welsh Regiment) was awarded the battle honour Detroit. The captured colors of the 4th U.S. Infantry are currently held by Firing Line: Museum of The Queen's Dragoon Guards and The Royal Welsh at Cardiff Castle in Wales.

In the Canadian Army, the Lincoln and Welland Regiment, the 56th Field Artillery Regiment, the Queen's York Rangers, the Essex and Kent Scottish, the Royal Regiment of Canada, and the Royal Hamilton Light Infantry preserve the history and heritage of the militia units that took part in the battle. These regiments carry the Detroit battle honour as does the Royal Newfoundland Regiment.

The patriotic song "The Bold Canadian" is attributed to a private of the 3rd York Militia who composed the song on the return trip to York from Detroit.

A bronze life-sized statue of Brock and Tecumseh, located in the centre of Windsor's Sandwich Towne Roundabout, was unveiled on 7 September 2018. The statue depicts Brock examining Detroit through a spyglass while Tecumseh, mounted on horseback, is watching the British battery bombard the fort. The statue commemorates the partnership between the two leaders which resulted in the capture of Detroit, and was sculpted by Canadian artist Mark Williams.

For his actions in the capture of Detroit, Brock was appointed a Knight Companion of the Order of the Bath (KB) on 10 October 1812, but died before learning of his knighthood.

In 2006, a bust of Brock was one of the fourteen statues and busts dedicated at the Valiants Memorial in Ottawa.

To commemorate the 200th anniversary of the War of 1812, a series of four 25 cent coins was issued by the Royal Canadian Mint in 2012. The coins depict Isaac Brock, Tecumseh, Laura Secord and Charles-Michel de Salaberry.

=== Prize list ===
The armaments and supplies captured from the Americans were "purchased" by the British government, and in accordance with prize regulations, the funds were distributed among the soldiers who participated in the siege. The number of "shares" awarded was determined based on the soldier's rank, similar to the Royal Navy practice of prize money. Privates received a single share and sergeants two, while officers received considerably more as their rank increased. Although a single share was valued at £1 7s, the militia received considerably more than the regulars. Militia privates initially received a "dividend" of £3 but later received a second payment of £1 10s. As the officer in command of British forces when Detroit surrendered, Brock was entitled to 160 shares. His estate eventually received £218.

=== Awards and medals ===
In 1848, the Military General Service Medal was established to recognize veterans of the Napoleonic Wars and the War of 1812. The veterans had to be living, and had to apply for the medal, resulting in the majority of eligible veterans never receiving the medal. Only three battles from the War of 1812 were represented by clasps on the medal: Detroit, Chateauguay, and Crysler's Farm. 138 men who served in the militia at the siege were awarded the Military General Service Medal with the Fort Detroit clasp.

Ten officers were awarded the Army Small Gold Medal for the capture of Detroit while Brock received the Army Large Gold Medal.

== Order of battle ==
British/Canadian & Tecumseh's confederacy order of battle	American order of battle
British Army (Major General Isaac Brock): 41st Regiment of Foot (Colonel Henry Procter); Royal Artillery; Royal Newfoundland Fencible Regiment; Canadian Militia: 1st Regiment of York Militia; 2nd Regiment of York Militia; 3rd Regiment of York Militia; Norfolk Militia; Lincoln Militia; Oxford Militia; Essex Militia; Norfolk Militia; Tecumseh's confederacy - Tecumseh Warriors of the Six Nations of the Grand River	Army of the Northwest, US Army (Commanding General: Brigadier General William Hull) (surrendered): 4th US Infantry Regiment (Colonel James Miller) (POW); Michigan Territory Militia; 1st Michigan Territorial Militia Regiment; 2nd Michigan Territorial Militia Regiment; Michigan Legionary Corps; Ohio Militia (Major Thomas Van Horne) (POW)
Provincial Marine: HMS Queen Charlotte; HMS General Hunter (Lieutenant Frédérick Rolette RN)	American supply vessels: Adams

== See also ==
- Battle of Frenchtown
