= William Dudley (colonel) =

American War of 1812 officer

- Born: (c. 1766; Fredericksburg, Virginia
- Died: 5 May 1813 (aged 46–47); Fort Meigs, Ohio, U.S.
- Spouse: Lucy Smith (m. 1792)
- Parents: Robert Dudley (father); Joyce Gayle (mother)
- Military career
- Branch: Kentucky Militia
- Rank: Colonel
- Unit: 13th Regiment
- Conflicts: War of 1812: Siege of Fort Meigs †

William Dudley (c. 1766 – May 5, 1813) was the commanding officer of the 13th Regiment of Kentucky Militia during the War of 1812. He died in battle leading his men at the Siege of Fort Meigs.

== Early life ==
Dudley was born about 1766 in Fredericksburg, Virginia to Robert Dudley and Joyce Gayle. He married Lucy Smith on August 23, 1792, in Fayette County, Kentucky.

Orphaned in 1778 at the age of 12, Dudley accompanied his brother Ambrose, a Baptist minister, west to Kentucky in 1786. He acquired 150 acres in Fayette County and was later appointed a magistrate. When the War of 1812 broke out, he was commissioned a lieutenant-colonel and given command of the 13th Regiment of Kentucky Militia.

== Military service ==
In the spring of 1813, the 13th Regiment was placed under the command of Brigadier General Green Clay. Clay's force numbered some 1,200 strong as they travelled by flatboat down the Maumee River to join Major General William Henry Harrison and the Army of the Northwest at Fort Meigs. On May 4, 1813, Clay's brigade was within a day's journey of the fort, which was then under siege by British forces led by Brigadier General Henry Procter and Indigenous forces led by Tecumseh.

Major General William Henry Harrison sent a messenger to Clay with orders for an attack on the British artillery position on the north side of the Maumee opposite the fort. Specifically, 800 men of Clay's brigade would land on the river's north bank, capture the batteries and spike the guns. They would then return to the boats, cross the river and proceed to the fort. Meanwhile, the rest of Clay's brigade would land on the river's south bank and fight their way into the fort. Clay assigned Dudley to command the attack on the batteries.

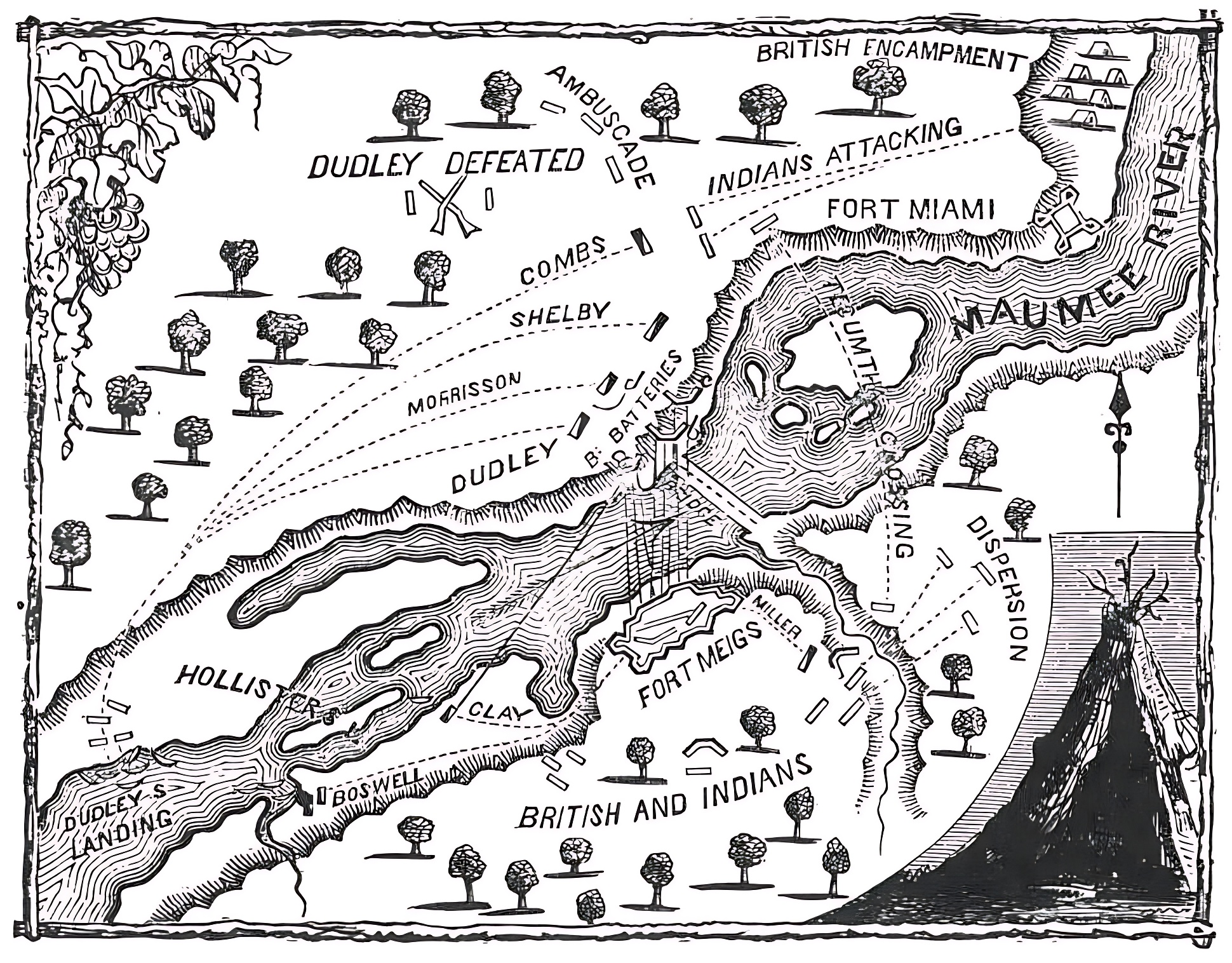
Plan of the Battle of 5 May, from Benson J. Lossing's Pictorial Field Book of the War of 1812

Dudley landed without opposition with 761 men from his own regiment, 60 from the 10th Regiment and 45 regulars. The British gunners fled as Dudley's men stormed the gun emplacements and cut down the British colours. Attempts to disable the guns failed as the iron spikes that were needed were aboard a boat that had landed on the opposite side of the river. Dudley had neglected to adequately brief his officers, so no attempt was made to fall back to the boats. When Dudley's scouts came under intense fire from Indigenous warriors in the woods, Dudley moved to reinforce them but was drawn into an ambush. Some accounts, however, insist that the Kentucky militia set out without orders and that Dudley followed his men in an attempt to bring them back.

Dudley was killed while attempting to organize an orderly retreat. He reportedly received a gunshot wound to his thigh before being tomahawked, scalped and mutilated.

Of Dudley's 866 officers and men only 170 managed to eventually reach the safety of Fort Meigs. 533 had been killed or were missing, while 183 were taken prisoner. Some of the dead were killed when Indigenous warriors forced their captives to "run the gauntlet" before they were turned over to British custody. While under British guard inside the fort, the unarmed prisoners were attacked by a group of Ojibwe. One British soldier was killed when the guards attempted to intervene. Close to two dozen prisoners were killed before Tecumseh and British Indian Department officers were able to stop the bloodshed.

Harrison later described Dudley as "weak and obstinate but brave." He was also critical of the conduct of the Kentucky militia:

It rarely occurs that a General has to complain of the excessive ardour of his men yet such appears always to be the case whenever the Kentucky militia are engaged. It is indeed the source of all their misfortune. They appear to think that valor can alone accomplish anything.... Such temerity although not as disgraceful is scarcely less fatal than cowardice.

The battle soon became known as "Dudley's Massacre" or "Dudley's Defeat".

Dudley's Defeat is commemorated by an historical marker on the grounds of the Maumee Public Library, in Maumee, Ohio, not far the site of the encounter.
