= James Winchester (general) =

American military figure and politician (1752–1826)

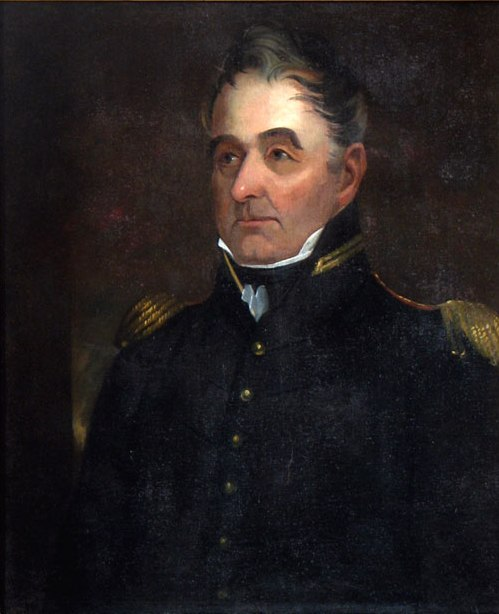
- Portrait of James Winchester by Ralph E. W. Earl, 1817.

Speaker of the Tennessee Senate
- In office 1796–1797
- Succeeded by: James White

Personal details
- Born: February 26, 1752 Westminster, Province of Maryland
- Died: July 27, 1826 (aged 74) Castalian Springs, Tennessee
- Spouse: Susan Black

Military service
- Allegiance: United States
- Branch/service: Continental Army; United States Army
- Rank: Brigadier general
- Commands: Army of the Northwest
- Battles/wars: American Revolutionary War; Battle of Staten Island (POW); Siege of Charleston (POW); War of 1812; Battle of Frenchtown (POW)

James Winchester (February 26, 1752 – July 26, 1826) was an American military officer, entrepreneur and statesman. He served in the Continental Army during the American Revolutionary War and was promoted to the rank of brigadier general during the War of 1812. He operated a shipping business, held various offices, and was one of the co-founders of the city of Memphis.

== Early life ==
James Winchester was born in Westminster, Maryland to William Winchester and Lydia Richards, on February 26, 1752. He was one of eleven siblings. Winchester and several of his brothers enlisted in the Maryland militia during the American Revolution. In the early part of the war he served in a battalion of the Flying Camp commanded by Brigadier General Hugh Mercer. In August 1777, he took part in Major General John Sullivan's failed raid on Staten Island, and was captured by British forces. He was later released in a prisoner exchange. In May 1778, he was commissioned a lieutenant in the 3rd Maryland Regiment which was assigned to the Southern Department in April 1780. He was taken prisoner a second time at the surrender of Charlestown, South Carolina on May 12, 1780. Exchanged in December, he was promoted to captain and served the remainder of the war under Major General Nathanael Greene.

At the conclusion of his service in November 1783, he was admitted as an original member of The Society of the Cincinnati in the state of Maryland.

== Life in Tennessee ==
After the war, Winchester settled in Davidson County, then part of the Southwest Territory, where he oversaw the construction of a mill and a distillery. In 1787 when Sumner County was formed following the partition of Davidson County, James served in the militia as a captain of horse, eventually being appointed as inspector of the brigade of the Metro District Militia. In 1790, Governor William Blount appointed Winchester as the commandant of the Militia of Sumner County and a Justice of the Peace. That same year he married Susan Black. In 1797, Winchester purchased a tract of land in Castalian Springs known as Bledsoe's Station and oversaw the construction of Cragfont, a Georgian style mansion that was completed in 1802. The mansion was designed and built by craftsmen from Winchesters home state of Maryland.

Following Tennessee's 1796 admission as a state to the Union, Winchester served in the State Senate, and was appointed as the states first Speaker of the Senate.

He was considered for the United States Senate in the 1809 election in Tennessee, but Jenkin Whiteside was elected to the seat. Winchester was also an unsuccessful candidate in the 1811 United States House of Representatives elections in Tennessee.

== War of 1812 ==
In March 1812, three months before the war with Britain began, Winchester was commissioned a brigadier general in the United States Army. After the surrender of Detroit by Brigadier General William Hull, Winchester assumed command of the Army of the Northwest although many felt that William Henry Harrison, the governor of the Indiana Territory, was better qualified. In September, Harrison who had been breveted a major-general in the Kentucky militia, unilaterally led an expedition to relieve Fort Wayne which was under siege by the Potawatomi and Miami. On September 19, Harrison met with Winchester at Fort Wayne and acknowledged Winchester's seniority, unaware that two days earlier President James Madison had decided to appoint Harrison to lead the Army of the Northwest.

=== Battle of Frenchtown ===
After his meeting with Harrison, Winchester agreed to conduct 400 regulars and 800 Kentucky militia down the Maumee River to the confluence with the Auglaize River in preparation for a campaign to retake Detroit. On September 25, his scouts skirmished with a British and Indigenous expedition led by Captain Adam Muir heading upriver towards Fort Wayne. Aware that they were badly outnumbered, Muir withdrew back to Maumee Bay before returning to Fort Amherstburg in Upper Canada.

Winchester's force reached the confluence with the Auglaze River at the end of September. He was visited by Harrison in early October and learned that his appointment as commander of the Army of the Northwest had been revoked, and that Harrison had been chosen to replace him. Harrison ordered the construction of Fort Winchester at the confluence, then instructed Winchester to proceed downriver to the Maumee Rapids. Winchester was to wait at the rapids for Harrison to arrive with additional men before advancing on Detroit.

Winchester proceeded slowly downriver. He spent several weeks at an encampment which his men, suffering from a lack of warm clothing and provisions, named Fort Starvation. He finally arrived at the rapids in early January. Winchester received word that a large quantity of stored grain could be found at Frenchtown 38 miles (61 km) to the north, and that the settlement was lightly defended by two companies of militia from Upper Canada. He dispatched 700 men under Lieutenant Colonel William Lewis to capture the settlement. On January 18, 1813, during the 1st Battle of Frenchtown, Lewis's men charged across the frozen River Raisin in an attack that forced the Canadian militia to retreat. In the running battle that followed, 12 Americans were killed and 55 wounded.

Winchester and the remainder of his force joined Lewis at Frenchtown two days later. He did little to prepare the position for a possible British counterattack, despite repeated warnings that a large enemy force had crossed the frozen Detroit River and was heading towards the village. Winchester dismissed the reports as "impossible rumour."

On January 23 Colonel Henry Proctor leading a large force of regulars and militia, and supported by Wyandot warriors led by Roundhead, retook the settlement during the 2nd Battle of Frenchtown. Winchester's regulars had been out in the open, and after a intense firefight that lasted about 25 minutes, retreated when the Wyandot surged forward. Winchester and Lewis tried in vain to rally their men but withdrawal had become a rout. Panicked men fled across the river unaware that some of the warriors had circled around to the American rear and blocked the escape route. Only 33 men managed to avoid death or capture. About 220 were killed and 147 men including Winchester and Lewis were taken prisoner.

Meanwhile, the Kentucky militia held their ground behind the palisade that protected the village. Over the next few hours they repulsed three frontal assaults and inflicted heavy casualties on the British gunners who had moved their artillery to within 50 yards (46 m) of the palisade. Procter finally pulled his men back and waited for his Indigenous allies to return. When Roundhead brought Winchester to the British line, Procter insisted that the American general order the holdouts to surrender. The senior surviving Kentucky militia officer, Major George Madison, initially refused since Winchester was a prisoner, but soon agreed to terms.

In total, the Americans suffered 397 killed and 547 taken prisoner. British casualties totalled 23 killed and 185 wounded.

After receiving a false report that Harrison was approaching from the south, Procter ordered an immediate withdraw back to Amherstburg. Since there was a shortage of sleighs, 64 badly wounded prisoners were left behind under the care of a few attendants. Early on the morning of 23 January, about 200 Indigenous warriors entered the village. They robbed the wounded prisoners of their clothing and blankets, killed those unable to walk, and burned the two makeshift hospitals. The survivors were taken away but any who struggled to keep up with their captors were killed. Most were brought to Amherstburg and ransomed by Procter. A contemporary report identified nine victims and estimated that an additional 15 to 18 were killed. This number was greatly inflated in later accounts.

Winchester was held prisoner at Quebec in Lower Canada for more than a year. He was released in a exchange in April 1814 and later assigned to command the District of Mobile. After the war ended, he resigned his regular army commission and returned home to Tennessee.

== Post war years ==
In 1819, Winchester served on the state commission to regulate the boundary between Tennessee and the Chickasaw. Winchester, along with Andrew Jackson and John Overton purchased the land that became Memphis and are considered the city's founders. A town charter was granted on May 22, 1819.

== Death and legacy ==
Winchester died in Gallatin, Tennessee at the age of 74 on July 26, 1826. He is buried in Winchester Cemetery at Gallatin.

The city of Winchester, Tennessee, is named in his honor although he never lived there. Winchester Road in Memphis is named in recognition of his role in founding the city.

Military offices
Preceded by William Hull	Commander of the Army of the Northwest; August 1812 to September 1812	Succeeded by William Henry Harrison
