= Army of the Northwest (United States) =

U.S. Army formation during the War of 1812

- Active: June 1812 – 16 August 1812; 5 September 1812 – 17 May 1815
- Country: United States
- Branch: United States Army
- Type: Field army
- Engagements: War of 1812: Siege of Detroit; Battle of Frenchtown; Siege of Fort Meigs; Battle of the Thames

Commanders
- Notable commanders: William Hull; William Henry Harrison

The Army of the Northwest was a United States Army formation formed at the outset of the War of 1812 and charged with taking control of the state of Ohio, the Indiana Territory, Michigan Territory and Illinois Territory. The army suffered initial defeats at Detroit and the Battle of Frenchtown, but was ultimately victorious in its objective of securing the Northwest and defeating Tecumseh. William Henry Harrison's successful campaigns while leading the Army of the Northwest are crediting with propelling him to national prominence.

== Campaigns ==
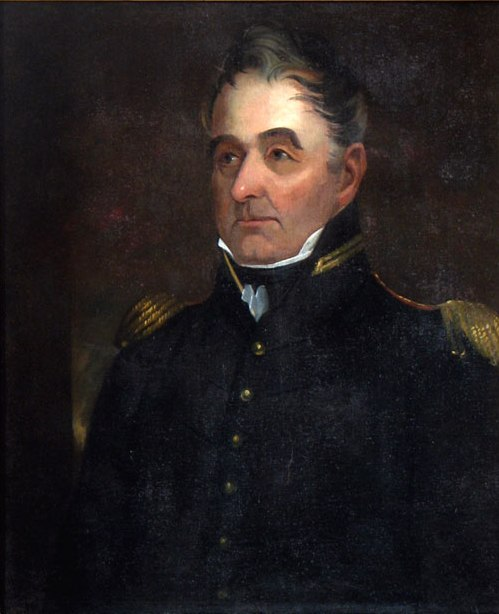
James Winchester

Prior to the declaration of war in June 1812, Congress expanded the army from 7 regular infantry regiments to 25. The first commander of the Army of the Northwest was William Hull, who led his forces from Toledo to Detroit, building Hull's Trace along the way. Hull surrendered his forces to the British at Detroit on 16 August 1812. By the autumn of 1812, much of the Indiana Territory was controlled by the British. James Winchester was then appointed to lead an expeditionary force of newly formed regiments to retake Detroit. Command of the army was split between Winchester and William Henry Harrison. Harrison detached a contingent to reinforce Fort Wayne and raid Potawatomi villages, and then turned to defend Fort Defiance. Harrison ultimately received a presidential commission from James Madison to take full command of the army, while Winchester continued to lead the 17th Regiment.

Winchester led a contingent in the Battle of Frenchtown on January 18 and 22, 1813. In the second confrontation, US forces were overwhelmed by allied British and Native American forces, who pushed them back across the frozen River Raisin with combined artillery and sniper fire. Winchester was captured, and many American prisoners had to be left behind. 397 Americans were killed in combat and 547 were captured. Dozens of prisoners were killed by Native warriors, and many more were left to die during a forced march to Fort Malden in Ontario. This was the deadliest battle for the Americans in the War of 1812.

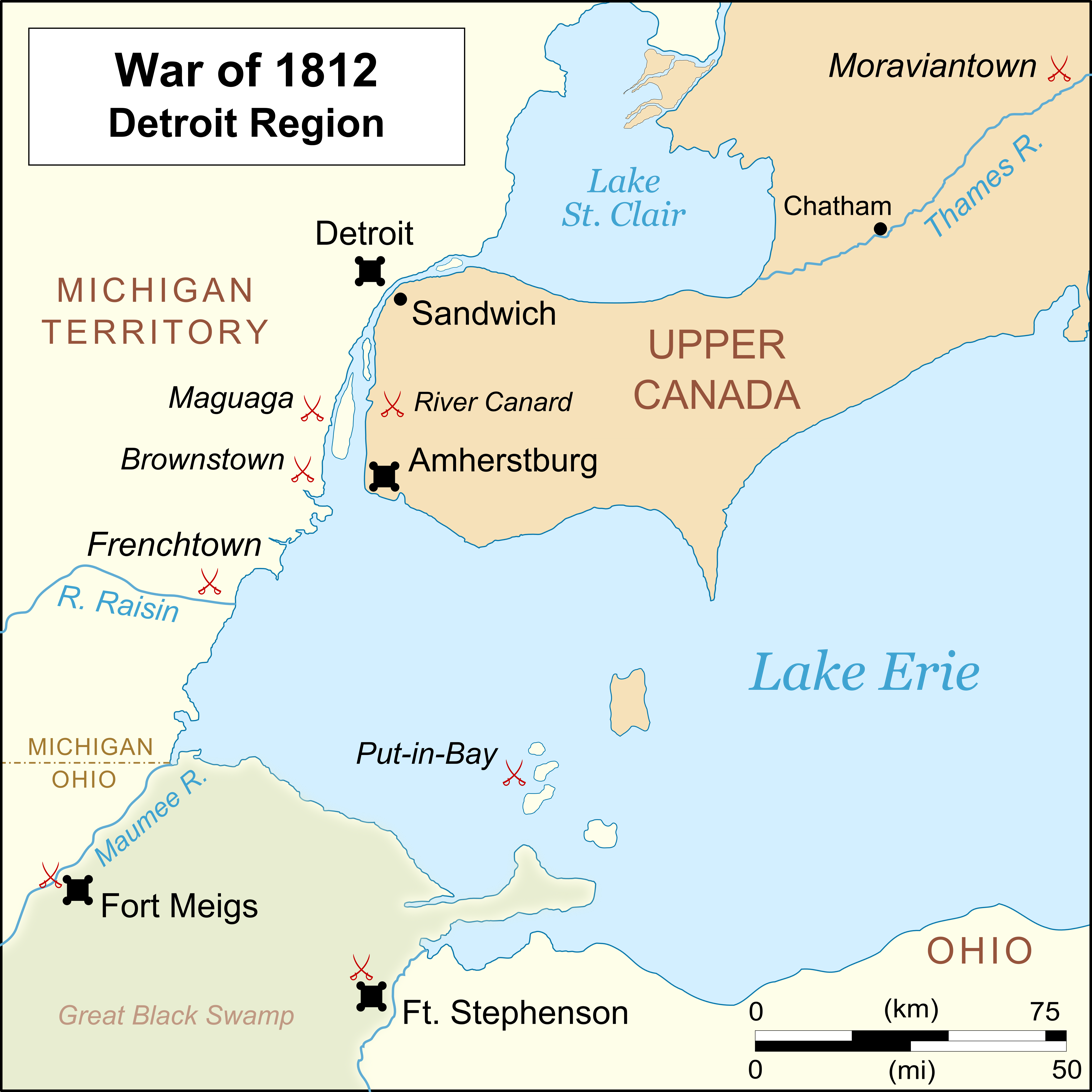
War of 1812 battles in the Detroit region

Outnumbered by the combined British and Native forces, Harrison proceeded cautiously. Harrison's forces spent the next several months building fortifications along the Maumee River. In April, they defended their newly created fort at the Siege of Fort Megis. In September of 1813, as American forces secured Lake Erie and opened up a front in Canada, Harrison's forces retook Detroit. From their improved position, Harrison was able to lead the Army of the Northwest to victory at the Battle of the Thames. Tecumseh was killed and his Native coalition was shattered, propelling Harrison to national prominence.

== Commanders ==
The following men served as commanders of the Army of the Northwest:

- William Hull
- James Winchester (September 5, 1812–September 24, 1812)
- William Henry Harrison (September 24, 1812–June 1, 1814)
- Duncan McArthur (June, 1814–May 17, 1815)
