= Fort Meigs =

- U.S. National Register of Historic Places
- U.S. National Historic Landmark
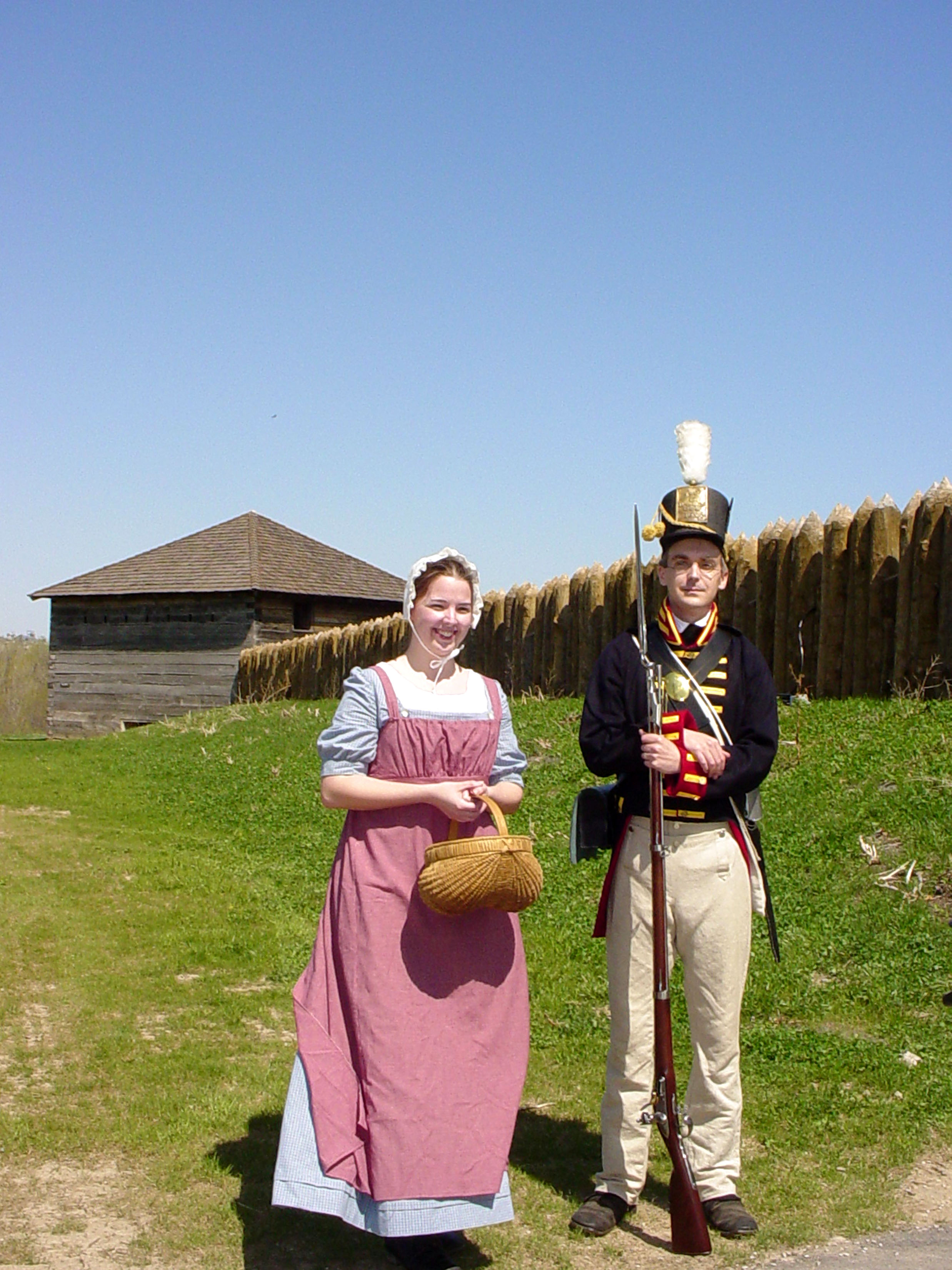
- Dressed in clothing of the period, these guides at Fort Meigs Historic Site prepare to give a tour of the facility on a clear day in the summer

- Location within Ohio Location within the United States
- Location: Perrysburg, Ohio
- Coordinates: 41°33′10″N 83°39′6″W
- Area: 62.25 acres (25.19 ha)
- Built: 1813
- NRHP reference No.: 69000151

Significant dates
- Added to NRHP: August 4, 1969
- Designated NHL: August 4, 1969

Fort Meigs was a United States fortification along the Maumee River in what is now Perrysburg, Ohio built during the War of 1812. The British, supported by Tecumseh's Confederacy, failed to capture the fort during the siege of Fort Meigs. It is named in honor of Ohio governor Return J. Meigs Jr., for his support in providing Major General William Henry Harrison with militia and supplies for a line of forts in Ohio and the Indiana Territory. The site is owned by the Ohio History Connection.

== History ==
Construction of the fort on the south side of the Maumee River began in February 1813 by soldiers under the command of Major General William Henry Harrison at a site where present-day Perrysburg, Ohio later developed, as a result of Brigadier General William Hull's failed campaign in Canada. The fort would provide a supply depot and staging point for American military operations in Upper Canada; and prevent British attacks upstream. The remnants of the British Fort Miami, build during the Northwest Indian War were across the river to the northeast. The winter climate was harsh, and the landscape unforgiving. An American sentry froze to death during his two hours of guard duty. The walls were constructed using logs cut to a 15 foot (4.6 m) length, partially buried in the ground, then protected by a steep earthen slope thrown against the logs to strengthen them against bombardment. An embankment against the interior side provided a parapet. When completed, the fort was the largest wooden walled fortification in North America.

=== First siege of Fort Meigs ===
On May 1, 1813, British allied forces, under Major General Henry Proctor and Tecumseh, began a bombardment of the fort, which had mustered 1,200 regulars and militia, and laid siege. Colonel McKune, an Ohio officer, recounts Americans fighting outside the fort during the first attack. Colonel McKune also recounts seeing General Harrison commanding his men "in person and on foot". Reinforcements reached the fort on May 4, increasing its garrison to 2,800. Early on the morning of May 5, a detachment from Clay's brigade under Colonel William Dudley landed from boats on the north bank of the river, stormed the British batteries on the north bank and spiked the guns. Coming under fire from Tecumseh's warriors in the woods, most of Dudley's men set off in pursuit, and were led deeper into the forest. In the woods, the disorganized Kentuckians suffered heavy casualties in confused fighting. Nearly 550 were captured, and of Dudley's 866 officers and men, only 150 returned to the fort. This became known as "Dudley's Massacre" or "Dudley's Defeat".

Tecumseh's warriors attacked any wood-gathering parties sent out from the fort. Harrison held out against the British by using a pair of 14-foot high embankments ("traverses") thrown up inside the walls along the length of the interior to absorb the incoming British shells. Proctor abandoned the siege on May 9, 1813 and retreated to Detroit.

=== Second siege of Fort Meigs ===
Having mobilized the garrison into an army, Harrison left General Green Clay in command of the fort, much reduced in size from its original layout. In July 1813, the British attempted to appease their Indigenous allies by again besieging Fort Meigs. The British brought 350 regulars, their Indigenous allies brought over 3,500 warriors. The warriors staged a mock battle to lure the garrison out. The Americans, however, saw through the ploy. After the failed siege attempt, the British moved on to Fort Stephenson, where Fremont, Ohio stands today. That attack also failed, causing heavy British losses and forcing their retreat to Upper Canada. Once the British had retreated from the area for good, General Harrison ordered Fort Meigs dismantled. In its place, a small, square stockade was constructed to serve as a supply base. The Treaty of Fort Meigs was signed there in 1817, and the post was abandoned that same year.

=== Later history ===
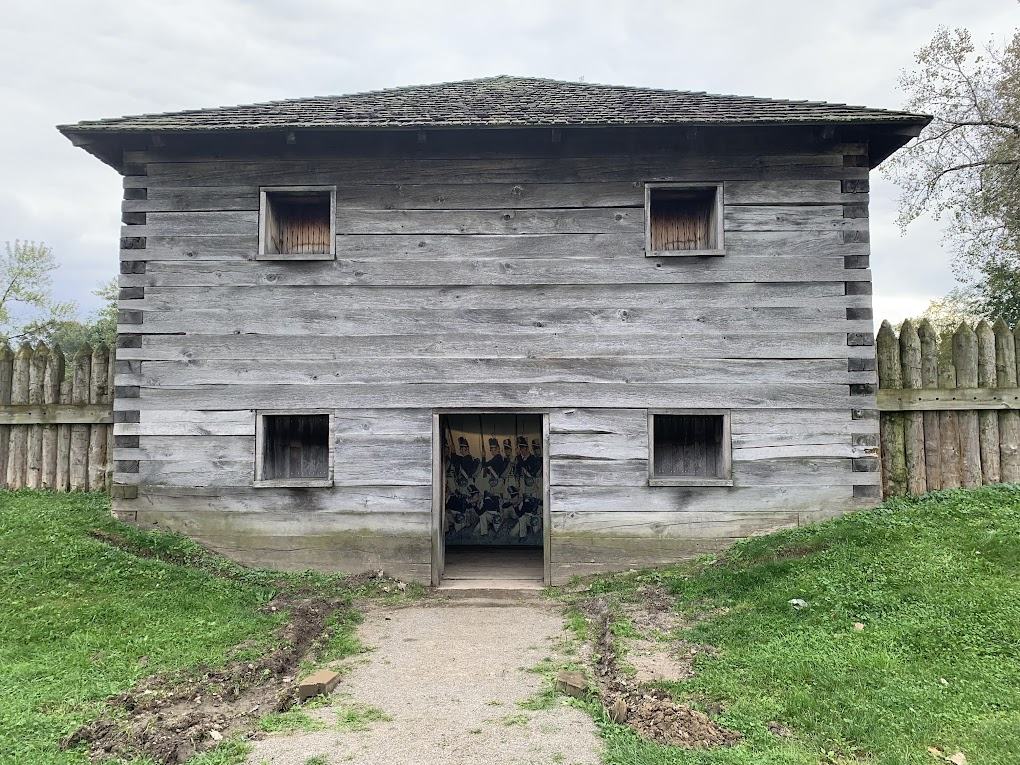
Fort Meigs has reconstructed blockhouses on their interpretive site to show that soldiers needed shelters that could be used as observation points during the War of 1812. In the blockhouses, there are interpretive exhibits that detail the lives of soldiers during the War of 1812 and the siege that took place at Fort Meigs in 1813.

In 1864, brothers Timothy and Thomas Hayes became the owners of the land on which the fort had stood and were instrumental in preserving it in memory and honor of the men who fought the battles. The heirs of the Hayes brothers sold the property to the state in 1907. On September 1, 1908, the large obelisk monument that can be seen from outside the fort was dedicated by a local veteran of the Civil War to the fallen soldiers of Fort Meigs. The Ohio Historical Society reconstructed the fort in the late 1960s, and its museum, featuring numerous artifacts uncovered during excavation in connection with the rebuilding, opened in 1974. It is a National Historic Landmark.

== Memorial ==
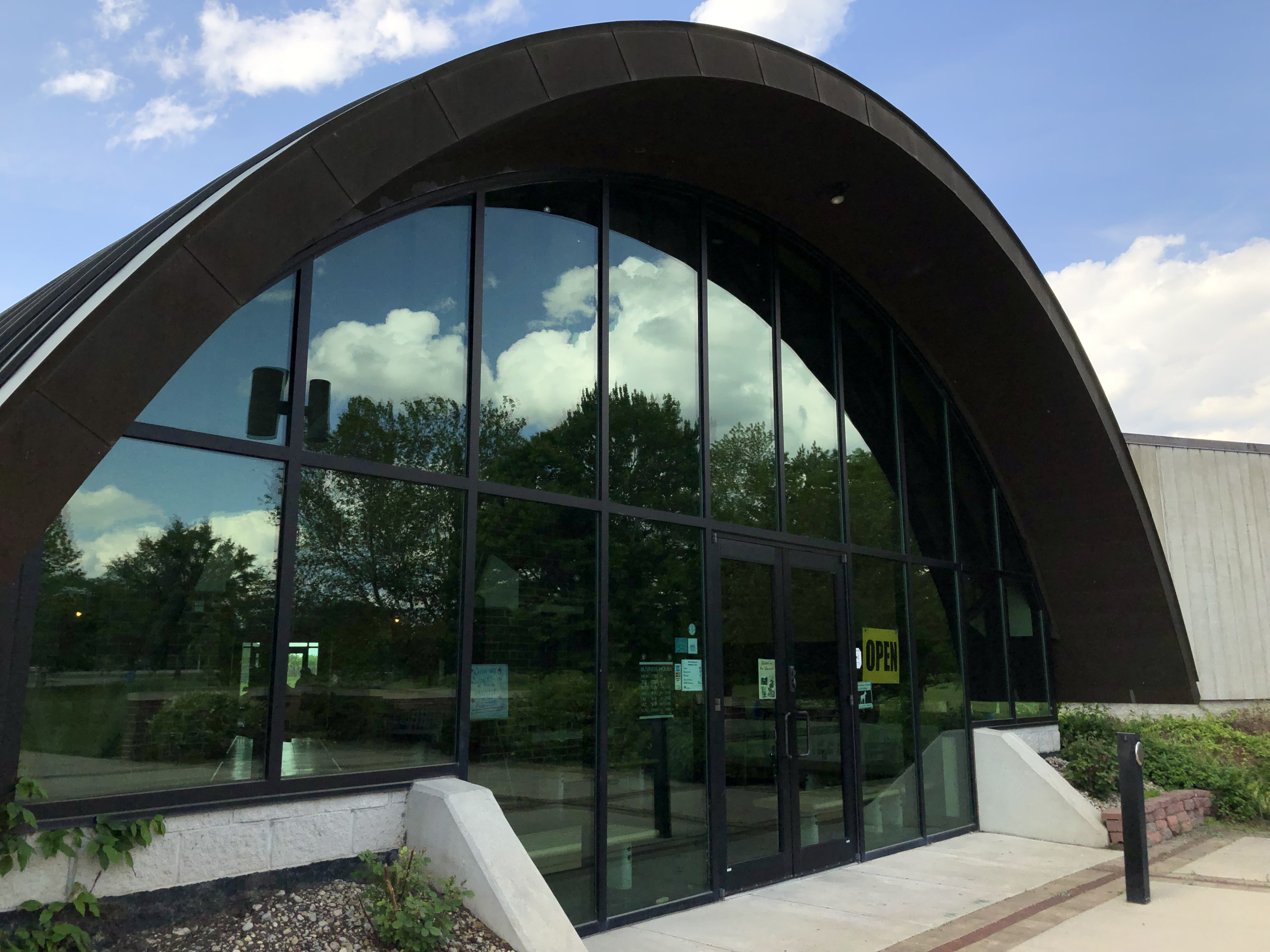
The museum entrance

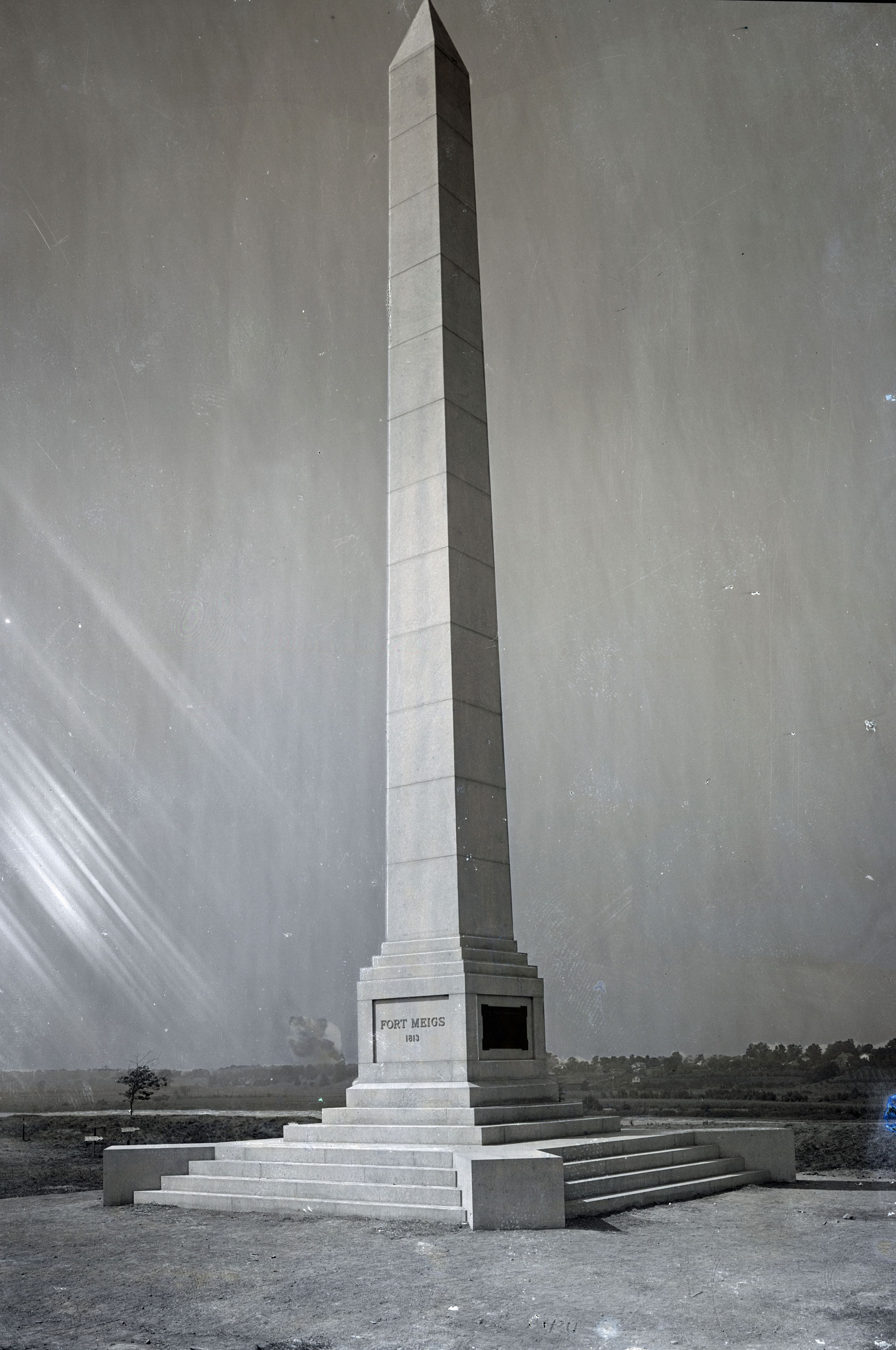
Fort Meigs Monument, 1910s

As of 2024, Fort Meigs is the site of an Ohio State Memorial in Perrysburg, Ohio. The 65-acre (263,000 m^{2}) park includes the full-size 10-acre replica of the 1813 fort. Between 2000 and 2003 its wooden palisades were rebuilt with fresh timbers, the seven blockhouses were repaired, and exhibits or facilities built inside four of them. The $6.2 million renovation project also saw the museum replaced by a Museum and Education Center of 14,000 square feet that features 3,000 square feet of exhibits on Ohio's role in the War of 1812, classrooms for student and adult workshops, and office and maintenance areas. The museum exhibit "Legacy of Freedom: Fort Meigs and the War of 1812" focuses on the themes of era, conflict, understanding and remembrance. These sections place the War of 1812 into the context of the times and explain Fort Meigs' role in the conflict.

The original grand traverse is preserved within the interior of the fort, although erosion has reduced it from its original 14-foot height, and a reverse traverse was constructed to the original specifications by the OHS. Located at the corner of a nearby cemetery are the remains of an original mortar position laid by the British for use during the siege.

== Re-enactments ==
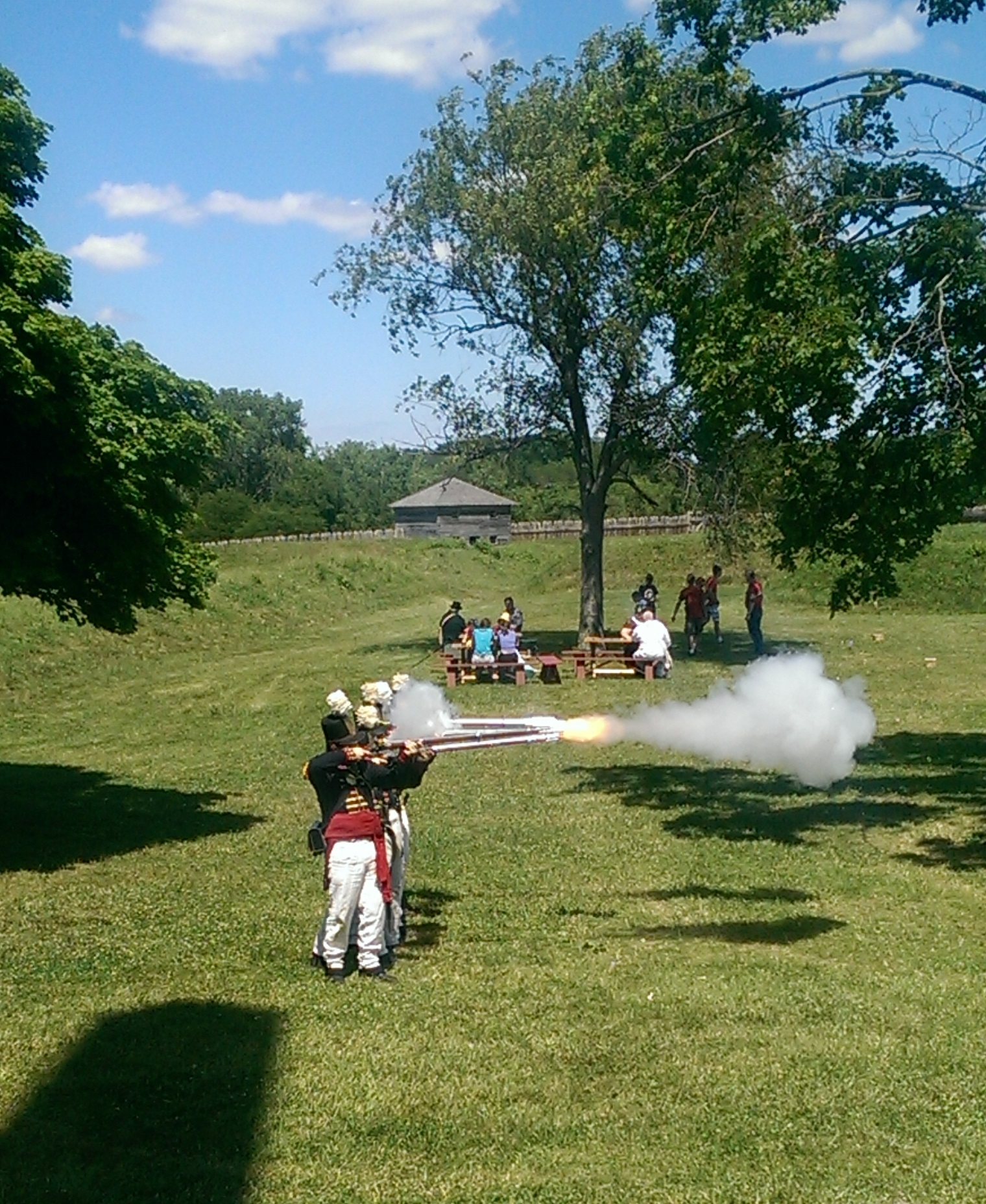
Historic reenactors firing flintlock muskets during Independence Day 2014

Several re-enactments take place at Fort Meigs each year. They include:

- First Siege, a battle re-enactment portraying the events of the siege of Fort Meigs in May 1813, complete with American and British infantry and artillery. This event is held on Memorial Day weekend and is followed on Monday by a ceremony commemorating the fallen soldiers.
- Muster on the Maumee, a "timeline event" held at the fort on Father's Day weekend, includes military re-enactors from ancient Roman soldiers to the modern-era soldier.
- Independence Day, a re-enactment portraying the events on the Fourth of July in 1813. It includes toasts and an 18-gun salute.
- Garrison Ghost Walk, an event held on the last two weekends in October; a re-enactor guides visitors through the dark fort to tell ghost stories.
