= William Hull =

American military officer and politician (1753–1825)

Brigadier General William Hull
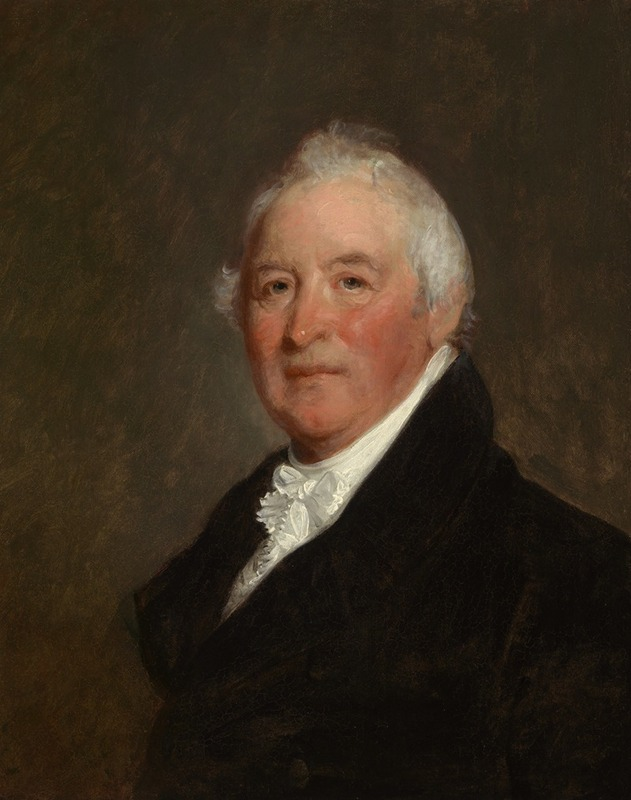
- Portrait by Gilbert Stuart, 1823

1st Governor of Michigan Territory
- In office March 22, 1805 – October 29, 1813
- Appointed by: Thomas Jefferson
- Succeeded by: Henry Procter (British military governor); Lewis Cass (as 2nd territorial governor)

Personal details
- Born: June 24, 1753 Derby, Connecticut Colony, British America
- Died: November 29, 1825 (aged 72) Newton, Massachusetts, U.S.
- Children: 4
- Education: Yale College

Military service
- Allegiance: United States
- Branch/service: Continental Army; United States Army
- Years of service: 1775–1783 (Continental Army); 1812–1814 (United States Army)
- Rank: Brigadier general
- Commands: Army of the Northwest
- Battles/wars: American Revolutionary War; Battle of White Plains; Battle of Trenton; Battle of Princeton; Battle of Stillwater; Battle of Saratoga; Battle of Fort Stanwix; Battle of Monmouth; Battle of Stony Point; War of 1812; Siege of Detroit (surrendered)

Brigadier General William Hull (June 24, 1753 – November 29, 1825) was an American army officer and politician. A veteran of the American Revolutionary War, he later served as governor of the Michigan Territory (1805–1813), where he negotiated land cessions with Native Americans through the Treaty of Detroit in 1807. Hull is most widely remembered as the general in the first months of the War of 1812 (1812–1815) who surrendered Fort Detroit to the British Army on August 16, 1812, ending the siege of Detroit.

Following the siege, he was paroled by the British and returned east, but court-martialed, convicted, and sentenced to death in a military court trial by the United States Army and the U.S. War Department, but later received a pardon from fourth President and military commander-in-chief James Madison (1751–1836, served 1809–1817), so his military and personal reputation somewhat recovered. He was assigned to several other commands in the next two years of the war, before the 1815 peace Treaty of Ghent and return to the pre-war status quo with the British.

== Early life and education ==
Hull was born on June 24, 1752, in Derby, Connecticut, then part of the Connecticut Colony. He graduated from Yale College (now Yale University) in 1772 and initially studied religion at his parents' behest. However, he soon shifted his focus to law, studying in Litchfield, Connecticut, and gaining admission to the bar in 1775.

Hull's legal career was interrupted by the outbreak of the American Revolutionary War. He joined the local militia (likely the Connecticut Line), quickly rising to the rank of Lieutenant Colonel due to his leadership skills.

== Career ==
=== American Revolutionary War (1775-1783) ===
At the outbreak of fighting in the American Revolutionary War (1775–1783), Hull joined a local militia and was quickly promoted to captain, then through the ranks to lieutenant colonel in the Continental Army. He fought in the following battles of the Revolutionary War: White Plains, Trenton, Princeton, Stillwater, Saratoga, Fort Stanwix, Monmouth, and Stony Point. He was recognized by commanding General George Washington (1732–1799), of the Continental Army and also by the Second Continental Congress meeting at Independence Hall in the temporary capital city of Philadelphia for his service.

Hull was a friend of the famous patriot Nathan Hale and tried to dissuade him from the dangerous spy mission that ultimately cost him his life at the young age of 21, when he was caught and hung by the British (as spying was considered a violation of the laws of war). Hull was largely responsible for making known and publicizing the famous last words attributed to Hale, "I only regret that I have but one life to give for my country.", one of the most famous historical quotes in American history.

At the conclusion of the war, Hull was admitted as an original member of The Society of the Cincinnati in the state of Massachusetts when it was established at the end of the Revolutionary War in 1783.

After the war, he moved to his wife's family estate in Newton, Massachusetts and served as a judge and served in the upper chamber of the General Court of Massachusetts (state legislature) of the Massachusetts Senate as a state senator. Six years after the war, he was elected captain of the veterans organization Ancient and Honorable Artillery Company of Massachusetts in 1789.

=== Michigan Territory Governor (1805-1813) and War of 1812 (1812-1815) ===
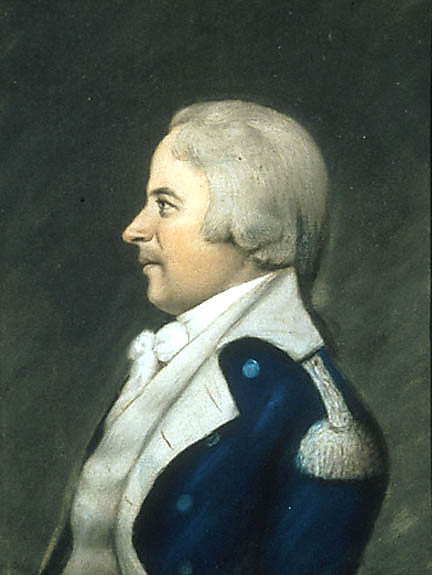
Brigadier General / Governor William Hull. portrait circa. 1800

On March 22, 1805, President Thomas Jefferson appointed Hull as Governor of the recently created Michigan Territory and as its Indian Agent. All of the territory was in the hands of the Indians except for two enclaves around Detroit and Fort Mackinac, so Hull worked to gradually purchase Indian land for occupation by American settlers. He negotiated the Treaty of Detroit in 1807 with the Odawa, Chippewa, Wyandot, and Potawatomi tribes, which ceded most of Southeast Michigan and northwestern Ohio to the United States, to the mouth of the Maumee River where Toledo developed. These efforts to expand American settlement began to generate opposition, particularly from Shawnee leaders Tecumseh and his brother Tenskwatawa, who urged resistance to American culture and to further land cessions.

By February 1812, Congress was making plans for war with Great Britain, including an invasion of Canada, while the British were busy recruiting Indian tribes in the Michigan and Canada area. Hull was in Washington, D.C., when 6th U.S. Secretary of War William Eustis (1753–1825, served 1809–1813), informed him that President James Madison wished to appoint him a Brigadier General in command of the newly organized Army of the Northwest. Hull at this point, was nearly 60 years old and had little interest in a new military command, so Colonel Jacob Kingsbury was selected to lead the force instead. Kingsbury however, fell ill before taking command, and the offer was repeated to Hull, who then accepted. His orders were to go to Ohio, whose Governor had been charged by President Madison with raising a 1,200-man militia United of Ohio men that would be augmented by the regular Army United of the 4th Infantry Regiment from duty at Vincennes in the Indiana Territory, to form the core of the Northwest Army. From there, he was to march the army to Fort Detroit where he was also to continue managing the surrounding region, of the Michigan Territory as territorial governor south and west of the Great Lakes and along the poorly undefended northern international border with British Canada.

==== March to Detroit (1812) ====
Hull arrived in Cincinnati on May 10, 1812, and took command of the militia at Dayton on May 25. The militia comprised three regiments who elected Duncan McArthur, Lewis Cass, and James Findlay as their commanding Colonels. They marched to Staunton and then to Urbana, Ohio, where they were joined by the 300-man 4th Infantry Regiment. The men of the militia were ill-equipped and little trained, averse to strong military discipline. Hull relied on the regulars to maintain discipline among the militia during the march.On June 15, 1812, Hull's force of over 2,000 men departed Urbana for Detroit. Rain and difficult terrain slowed their progress, and they did not reach the rapids of the Maumee River until June 29.

Unbeknownst to Hull, the United States Congress declared war on the United Kingdom on June 18, 1812, and that same day Secretary Eustis sent two letters to commanding General Hull. He sent one of them by special messenger which arrived on June 24—but it did not mention the declaration of war. The second one did announce the declaration of war, but Eustis sent it via the postal service and it did not arrive until July 2. As a result, Hull was still unaware that his army was at war when he reached the rapids of the Maumee. In the meantime, while camped at the Maumee Rapids, taking advantage of the waterway, he sent the schooner Cuyahoga Packet ahead of the army to Detroit with a number of invalids, supplies, and official documents; but the British commander at Fort Amherstburg had received the declaration of war two days earlier, and he captured the ship as it sailed past. Thus, he gained all of Hull's military papers and plans for an attack on Fort Amherstburg.

==== Invasion of Canada (1812) ====
Hull was partly the victim of his government's poor preparation for war and poor communication. He had repeatedly urged his superiors while he was governor to build a naval fleet on Lake Erie in order to defend Detroit, Fort Mackinac, and Fort Dearborn, but his requests were ignored by General Henry Dearborn, the commander of the northeast.

Hull began an invasion of Canada on July 12, 1812, crossing the Detroit River east of Sandwich (the area around Windsor, Ontario). He issued a proclamation to the "inhabitants of Canada" indicating that he wanted to free them from the "tyranny" of Great Britain and to give them the liberty, security, and wealth which his own country was experiencing—unless they preferred "war, slavery and destruction". It soon became apparent that he would encounter great resistance, however, and he withdrew to the American side of the river on August 7 after receiving news of a Shawnee ambush on Major Thomas Van Horne's 200 men who had been sent to support the American supply convoy; half of the troops were killed. Hull had also faced a lack of support from his officers and fear among the troops of a possible massacre by Indian forces. A group of 600 troops led by Lieutenant Colonel James Miller remained in Canada, attempting to supply the American position in the Sandwich area, with little success.

==== Surrender of Detroit (1812) ====
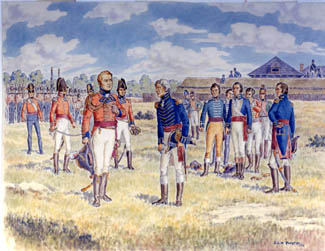
Hull surrendering Fort Detroit to Isaac Brock on August 16, 1812

Hull surrendered Fort Detroit to General Isaac Brock on August 16, 1812, because Brock had tricked him into thinking that he was vastly outnumbered by his foes. The force included 600 Indian warriors and 1,300 soldiers, as well as two warships, according to Brock's report. Hull had 2,500 soldiers under his command. The number of troops under Hull's command was estimated at between 750 and 1060 by his grandson.

Brock sent Hull a demand for surrender:

The force at my disposal authorizes me to require of you the immediate surrender of Fort Detroit. It is far from my intention to join in a war of extermination, but you must be aware, that the numerous body of Indians who have attached themselves to my troops, will be beyond control the moment the contest commences.

Hull believed that the surrender was a valid step because he was lacking adequate gunpowder and cannonballs to withstand a long siege. The move also saved his 2,500 soldiers and 700 civilians from "the horrors of an Indian massacre", as he later wrote.

In 1814, Hull was court martialed at a trial presided over by General Henry Dearborn, with future president Martin Van Buren as the special judge advocate in charge of the prosecution. Robert Lucas, the future governor of Ohio and territorial governor of Iowa, gave evidence against him. Hull was convicted of cowardice and neglect of duty and was sentenced to be shot. However, President James Madison commuted the sentence to merely dismissing him from the Army in recognition of his heroic service during the Revolutionary War.

== Later life and death ==
Hull lived the remainder of his life in Newton, Massachusetts with his wife Sarah Fuller. He wrote Detroit: Defence of Brig. Gen. Wm. Hull in 1814 and Memoirs of the Campaign of the Northwestern Army of the United States: A.D. 1812, published in 1824 and both attempting to clear his name. Some later historians have agreed that he was unfairly made a scapegoat for the embarrassing loss of Detroit. The publication of his Memoirs in 1824 changed public opinion somewhat in his favor, and he was honored with a dinner in Boston on May 30, 1825. That June, the Marquis de Lafayette visited him and declared, "We both have suffered contumely and reproach; but our characters are vindicated; let us forgive our enemies and die in Christian love and peace with all mankind." Hull died at home in Newton several months later, on November 29, 1825.

His son Abraham was an Army captain during the War of 1812 and died at the Battle of Lundy's Lane at age 27. His remains were buried in the Drummond Hill Cemetery in Niagara Falls, Ontario, the only American officer to be buried there. Hull was also uncle to Isaac Hull, son of his brother Joseph. Joseph died while Isaac was young, so Hull adopted the boy. Isaac commanded the USS Constitution during the War of 1812.

== See also ==
- List of people pardoned or granted clemency by the president of the United States
- The Society of the Cincinnati
- The American Revolution Institute

Political offices
New title Office created	Territorial Governor of Michigan; March 22, 1805–October 29, 1813	Succeeded by Lewis Cass
Military offices
New title Army formed	Commander of the Army of the Northwest; May 1812–August 1812	Succeeded by James Winchester
