= William Atherton (soldier) =

American soldier

- Born: January 10, 1793
- Died: September 11, 1863 (aged 70)
- Burial place: Greencastle City Cemetery, Greencastle, Indiana, U.S.
- Spouse: Mary "Polly" Lyon
- Children: Robert, Huldah Ann, Julia
- Relatives: Thomas W. Bennett (Idaho politician) son-in-law
- Military career
- Allegiance: United States
- Branch: Kentucky Militia
- Rank: Private
- Unit: 1st Rifle Regiment
- Conflicts: War of 1812 • Battle of Frenchtown

William Atherton (January 10, 1793 – September 11, 1863) was an American soldier and a veteran of the War of 1812 from Kentucky. He was a private in the 1st Rifle Regiment commanded by Lieutenant Colonel John Allen, and served in the Army of the Northwest under Brigadier General James Winchester and Major General William Henry Harrison. In 1842, Atherton published an account that detailed his wartime service with the Kentucky militia, including their defeat at the Battle of Frenchtown and the subsequent murder of a number of wounded prisoners by Indigenous allies of the British. In his narrative, Atherton recounted his time as a captive of the Potawatomi and his later imprisonment by the British.

== Early life ==
Little is known about Atherton's early life. According to his gravestone, he was born on January 10, 1793, possibly in Virginia, and likely came to Shelbyville in Shelby County, Kentucky at a young age. Shelby County was established in 1792, the same year that Kentucky became a state, and is named for Isaac Shelby, the first Governor of Kentucky.

== War of 1812 ==
Atherton was one of the 25,010 Kentuckians who served during the War of 1812, fighting against both the British and their Native American allies. This represented about five out of every six men then of military age.

In August 1812, at the age of nineteen, Atherton enlisted as a private in Captain John Simpson's company of the 1st Rifle Regiment. In September, Atherton participated in the destruction of Miami villages in the vicinity of Fort Wayne, and in the construction of Fort Winchester at the confluence of the Auglaze and Maumee rivers. He endured the deprivations suffered by Brigadier General Winchester's army when they were compelled by the weather to remain encamped on the Maumee River east of Fort Winchester for almost two months.

In late December, Major General Harrison ordered Winchester to move downriver to the Maumee Rapids in preparation for a campaign to retake Detroit and advance into Upper Canada. While at the rapids Winchester received word that Frenchtown, a small settlement on the River Raisin, was lightly defended, and was led to believe that the British intended to raze the village. Ignoring his orders from Harrison to remain at the rapids, Winchester dispatched Lieutenant Colonel William Lewis and Lieutenant Colonel John Allan to Frenchtown.

Atherton was wounded in the shoulder on January 18, 1813, during the first engagement at Frenchtown when Lewis and Allan forced a small detachment of militia and Potawatomi to retreat. In an account written years later, Atherton described the tactics used by the enemy as they withdrew:

Their method was to retreat rapidly until they were out of sight, (which was soon the case in the brushy woods,) and while we were advancing they were preparing to give use another fire; so we were generally under the necessity of firing upon them as they were retreating. During the charge, I saw several of our brave boys lying upon the snow wallowing in the agonies of death.

Due to his injury, Atherton did not fight in the second engagement four days later. Winchester had arrived with reinforcements on January 20, but did little to prepare for a possible counterattack. At dawn on January 22, British regulars led by Colonel Henry Procter and Indigenous warriors led by the Wyandot war leader Roundhead launched a surprise attack. During several hours of fighting, Allan was killed and both Winchester and Lewis were captured. When Roundhead brought Winchester to the British lines, Procter demanded that the American general order his men to surrender. The senior Kentucky militia officer, Major George Madison, initially refused to accept the order since the general was a prisoner, but soon agreed to terms.

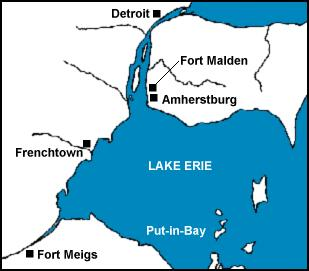
Location of Frenchtown and other settlements in the Detroit region during the War of 1812

After receiving a false report that Harrison was approaching from the south, Procter ordered an immediate withdraw. Since there was a shortage of sleighs, severely wounded prisoners were left behind under the care of a few attendants. Atherton chose to remain behind to help with the wounded. He and the others were under the impression that the British would soon send back sleighs to retrieve them.

On the morning of January 23, about 200 Indigenous warriors entered the village. They robbed the wounded of their clothing and blankets, killed those unable to walk, and burned the buildings that had housed them. Atherton was taken captive by the Potawatomi. He witnessed the murder of Captain Paschal Hickman, Captain Nathaniel Hart negotiating for his life, and the burning of one of the makeshift hospitals.

Atherton and other survivors were taken away but any who struggled to keep up were killed. On the road north from Frenchtown he saw "the bodies of those poor hapless boys who had made the attempt, but were too badly wounded to travel, massacred, scalped, and stripped." Most of the captives were brought to Amherstburg or Detroit and ransomed. Atherton, however, remained with the Potawatomi for several months. In June 1813, an inhabitant of Detroit secured his release by trading a horse for him. Atherton then spent the summer in British captivity at Amherstburg. After the American naval victory at the Battle of Lake Erie, he was transferred to Québec.

In contrast to Elias Darnell, a Kentucky militiaman who escaped Indigenous captivity after the Battle of Frenchtown and was quickly paroled by the British, Atherton was incarcerated until May 1814 when he was released near Plattsburgh in a prisoner exchange.

== Later life ==
Atherton arrived back home at Shelbyville on June 20, 1814. He married Mary "Polly" Lyon (1800–1860) on 12 May 1817 and had at least three children. He became a minister in the Methodist church and moved to Greencastle, Indiana in 1849.

In 1842, Atherton reluctantly published his account of his experiences during the war including the Battle of Frenchtown, his captivity among the Potawatomi, his internment by the British, and his journey home to Kentucky. In the forward to his Narrative of the Suffering and Defeat of the North-Western Army under General Winchester he wrote:

I think it proper that the rising generation should know what their fathers suffered, and how they acted in the hour of danger; that they sustained the double character of "Americans and Kentuckians."

Atherton died on September 11, 1863, and is buried at the Greencastle City Cemetery.

== Legacy ==
Atherton's narrative provides a rare common soldier's perspective of the War of 1812. It includes his personal observations of Indigenous customs, and contrasts his treatment by the Potawatomi with his later treatment by the British. He describes the conditions endured by the Kentucky militia in the fall of 1812. While stalled east of Fort Winchester, they suffered greatly from a lack of food and warm clothing. More than 300 men were afflicted with typhus with three or four dying every day. Atherton wrote: "We now saw nothing but hunger, and cold, and nakedness, staring us in the face.

Although Atherton's experience of combat was limited to the first engagement at Frenchtown, his description of the battle is a gruesome testimony to how adept the Canadian militia and the Potawatomi were at bush fighting. He wrote:

The fight now became very close, and extremely hot... About the going down of the sun, I received a wound in my right shoulder. A moment before I received the shot, I saw John Locke and Joseph Simpson advancing together, some distance to the left, and ahead of the main body. One was killed and the other wounded not far from the spot where I saw them.

His experiences while being held captive by the Potawatomi, followed by his internment at Amherstburg and Quebec, has been used in schools in Kentucky. Atherton preferred his treatment by the Potawatomi to that of the British. He described the Potawatomi as "brave, generous, hospitable, kind, and among themselves, an honest people." The British officers, however, were "haughty and overbearing, doing nothing for our comfort" and "perfectly destitute of human feelings."

In 1890, historian Emma Mary Connelly noted that Atherton effectively described the hardships that both he and others endured during the war. His account has been frequently referenced in histories of the War of 1812, notably in Pierre Berton's 1980 The Invasion of Canada. and Ralph Naveaux's 2022 Invaded on All Sides.

Atherton's story has been featured in numerous museum exhibits, and in documentaries about the war, including The War of 1812, first broadcast on PBS in October 2011. The American public broadcaster noted the uniqueness of Atherton's narrative in educational material that accompanied the documentary:

The substantial first-person record of the war comes primarily from the educated classes — officers and their wives. Two exceptions to this are the excellent memoirs written by the British foot soldier, Shadrach Byfield, and the American militiaman, William Atherton. Their experiences encompass the full experience of war — battles, injuries, imprisonment and aftermath.

An audio recording of Atherton's narrative, read by James E. Carson, has been produced by LibriVox.

== See also ==
- Battle of Frenchtown
- Shadrack Byfield - a British foot soldier's account of the Battle of Frenchtown
