= Frankfort Cemetery =

Historic site in Franklin County, Kentucky

- Frankfort Cemetery and Chapel
- U.S. National Register of Historic Places
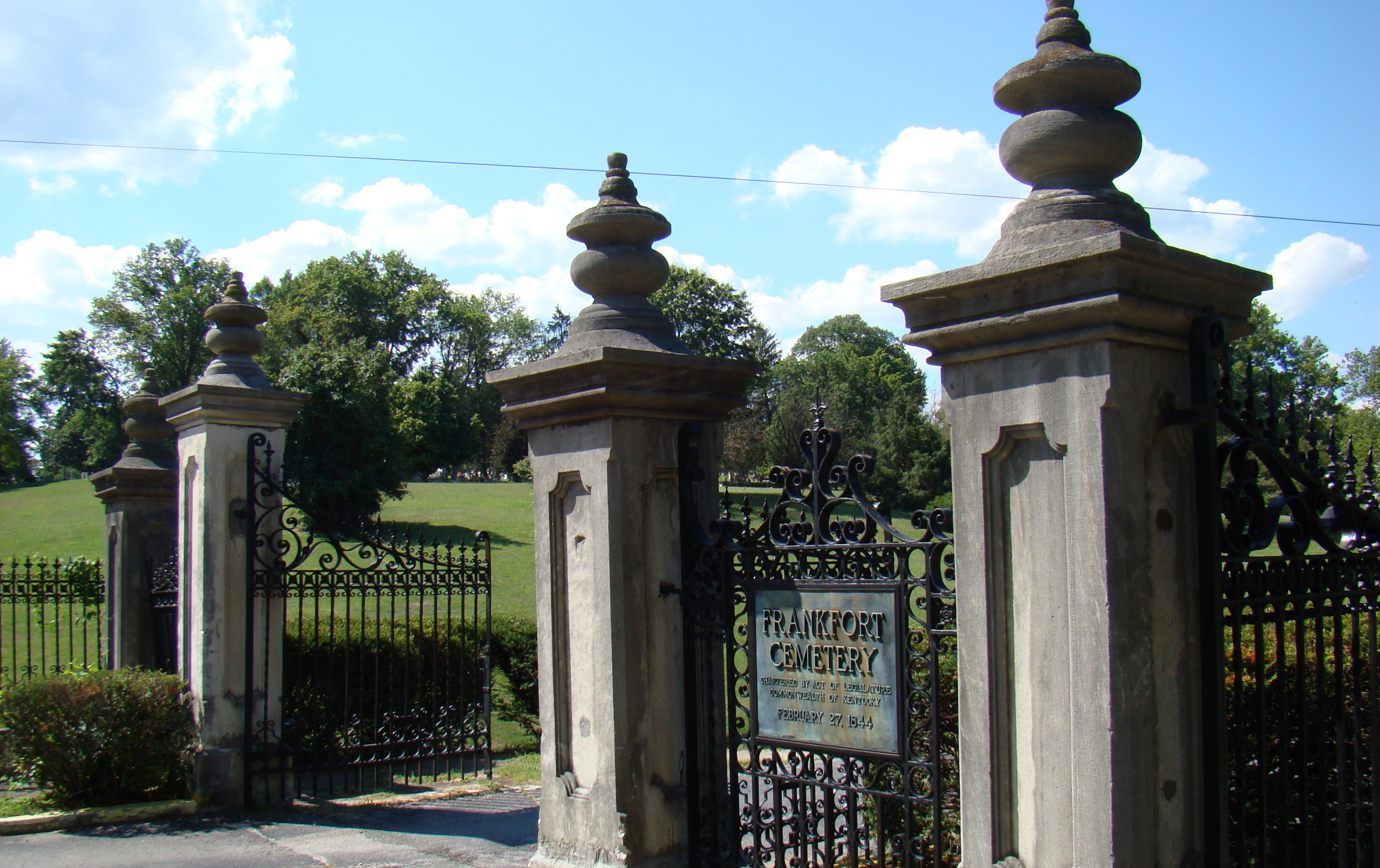
- Entrance to Frankfort Cemetery

- Location within Kentucky Location within the United States
- Location: Frankfort, Kentucky
- Coordinates: 38°11′52.2″N 84°52′01.8″W
- Built: 1844
- Architect: Carmichael, Robert; Launitz, Robert E.
- Architectural style: Romanesque
- Website: www.frankfortcemetery.org
- NRHP reference No.: 74000872
- Added to NRHP: July 12, 1974

The Frankfort Cemetery is a historic rural cemetery located on East Main Street in Frankfort, Kentucky. The cemetery is the burial site of Daniel Boone, the famed frontiersman, and contains the graves of other famous Americans including seventeen Kentucky governors and a Vice President of the United States.

The cemetery is built on a bluff overlooking the Kentucky River with views of the Kentucky State Capitol, the Kentucky Governor's Mansion, downtown Frankfort, south Frankfort, and the Capitol District.

== History ==
The cemetery was created by Judge Mason Brown, son of statesman John Brown, inspired by a visit to Mount Auburn Cemetery in Boston. Brown enlisted other Frankfort civic leaders and on February 27, 1844, the Kentucky General Assembly approved the cemetery's incorporation. The 32-acre (13 ha) property, then called Hunter's Garden, was purchased in 1845 for $3,801. Additional land was purchased in 1858 and in 1911 for a total of 100 acres (40 ha).

Brown hired Scottish-born landscape architect Robert Carmichael to design the cemetery. The cemetery is laid out in a style similar to Mount Auburn, with curving lanes, terraces and a circle of vaults. Carmichael imported and planted trees and flowering shrubs from the mountains of Kentucky, intending the cemetery to double as an arboretum in a time when residents could not easily travel to see mountain plants not native to the region. Carmichael is also buried in the cemetery.

There are numerous monuments and memoria in the cemetery. A central feature is the State Mound, featuring a Kentucky War Memorial designed by Robert E. Launitz and inscribed with the names of officers killed in numerous wars. During the American Civil War, Frankfort Cemetery was used for the final resting place of soldiers on both sides of the conflict. Corporal Lyman B. Hannaford of the 103rd Ohio Infantry notes in his letter dated April 2, 1863, "They are planting (as soldiers term it) a good many soldiers here—almost one per day. That is a good many for the number of troops here."

== Interments ==
=== Kentucky Governors ===
Nineteen Kentucky governors are buried there:

- John Adair
- J. C. W. Beckham
- Luke P. Blackburn
- William O'Connell Bradley
- Simon Bolivar Buckner, Sr.
- John J. Crittenden
- Julian Carroll
- Martha Layne Collins
- William Goebel
- Christopher Greenup
- Robert P. Letcher
- George Madison
- Charles S. Morehead
- James T. Morehead
- Edwin P. Morrow
- Charles Scott
- Augustus O. Stanley
- Lawrence Wetherby
- Simeon Willis

=== Other notable people ===
Other notable people buried at Frankfort Cemetery include:

- Rufus B. Atwood, president of Kentucky State University
- Bland Ballard, soldier and statesman
- William T. Barry, member of the United States Senate and United States Postmaster General
- George M. Bibb, U.S. Senate and United States Secretary of the Treasury
- Daniel Boone, American pioneer
- Rebecca Boone, American pioneer and the wife of Daniel Boone
- John Brown, lawyer, statesman
- Simon Bolivar Buckner, Jr., U.S. Army general, World War II
- Johnson N. Camden Jr., U.S. Senator
- Henry Clay, Jr., soldier and statesman
- Martha Layne Collins, Governor Of Kentucky
- Henry Crist, Kentucky pioneer, member of the Kentucky General Assembly and the United States House of Representatives
- George Bibb Crittenden, Confederate Army general
- Thomas Leonidas Crittenden, Union Army general
- Anthony Crockett, Revolutionary War soldier and politician
- John Milton Elliott, judge, murdered
- Thomas Y. Fitzpatrick, U.S. Representative, County Judge, County Attorney
- Gilbert Genesta, magician, drowned
- Martin D. Hardin, politician
- Parker Watkins Hardin, politician, Attorney General of Kentucky 1879–1888
- James Harlan Jr., state politician and judge
- Joel Tanner Hart, sculptor
- Elizabeth Ann Hulette, professional wrestling manager
- Enoch Edgar Hume, physician and former mayor of Frankfort, Kentucky
- Andrew J. James, lawyer and state representative, who served as Attorney General and as Secretary of State of Kentucky
- Willard Rouse Jillson, Kentucky historian, geologist
- Richard Mentor Johnson, Vice President of the United States
- William Lindsay, U.S. Senate
- Humphrey Marshall, U.S. and Confederate States Congressman, Confederate Army general
- Thomas Francis Marshall, lawyer, politician, Kentucky House of Representatives
- John Calvin Mason, attorney, U.S. Representative
- Silas B. Mason, construction contractor who built the Grand Coulee Dam, racehorse owner/breeder who won the 1933 Preakness Stakes
- Samuel McKee, law, U.S. Representative
- Presley O'Bannon, U.S. Marine credited as first to raise the American flag over foreign soil in 1805 at the Battle of Derna.
- Theodore O'Hara, poet, newspaperman, soldier
- Lucy Phenton Pattie (1842–1922), initiated into the Kentucky Chi chapter (Kentucky Military Institute) following the Civil War, making her the first and only female member of the Sigma Alpha Epsilon fraternity
- Thomas H. Paynter, U.S. Senate
- Paul Sawyier, Kentucky artist
- Solomon P. Sharp, Attorney General of Kentucky murdered in the Beauchamp–Sharp Tragedy
- John Simpson, soldier, member of the Kentucky General Assembly, Speaker of the Kentucky House of Representatives, and Congressman-elect
- Daniel Weisiger Swigert (1833–1912), Thoroughbred racehorse breeder, owner of Elmendorf Farm
- Isham Talbot, U.S. Senate
- Landon Addison Thomas, businessman and member of the Kentucky General Assembly from Frankfort, Kentucky
- Thomas Todd, Associate Justice of the United States Supreme Court
- South Trimble, Kentucky House of Representatives, U.S. Representative, Clerk of the United States House of Representatives
- Emily Harvie Thomas Tubman, businesswoman and philanthropist from Frankfort, Kentucky, was an early supporter of the Christian Church (Disciples of Christ)
- Edward Ellsworth Underwood (1864–1942) early African American medical doctor, minister, and community leader
- John White, served in the Kentucky House of Representatives and in the U.S. House, where he served as Speaker of the House

== Gallery ==
Gravestones and Memorials in Frankfort Cemetery

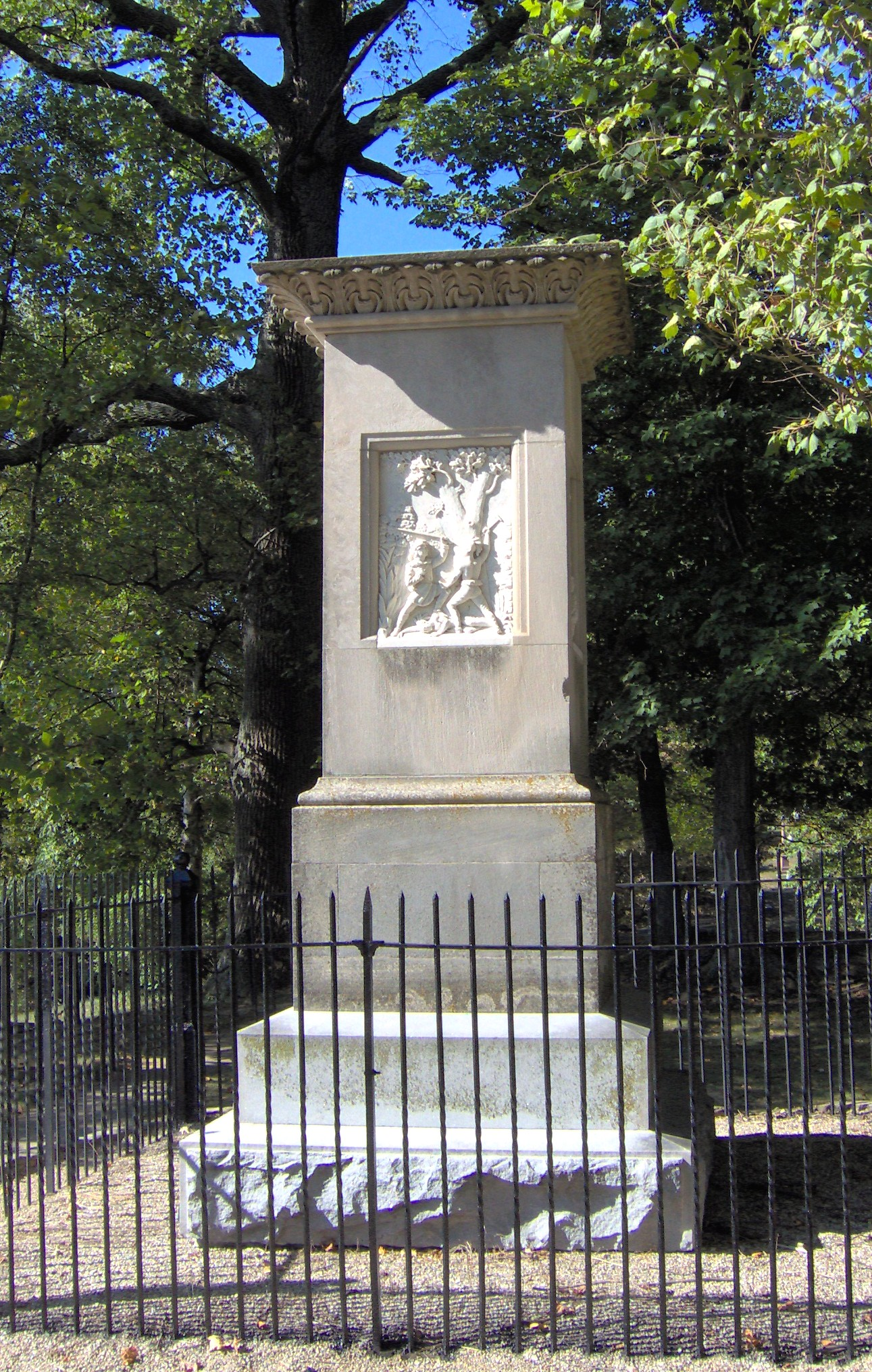
Pioneer explorer Daniel Boone and wife Rebecca Bryan.

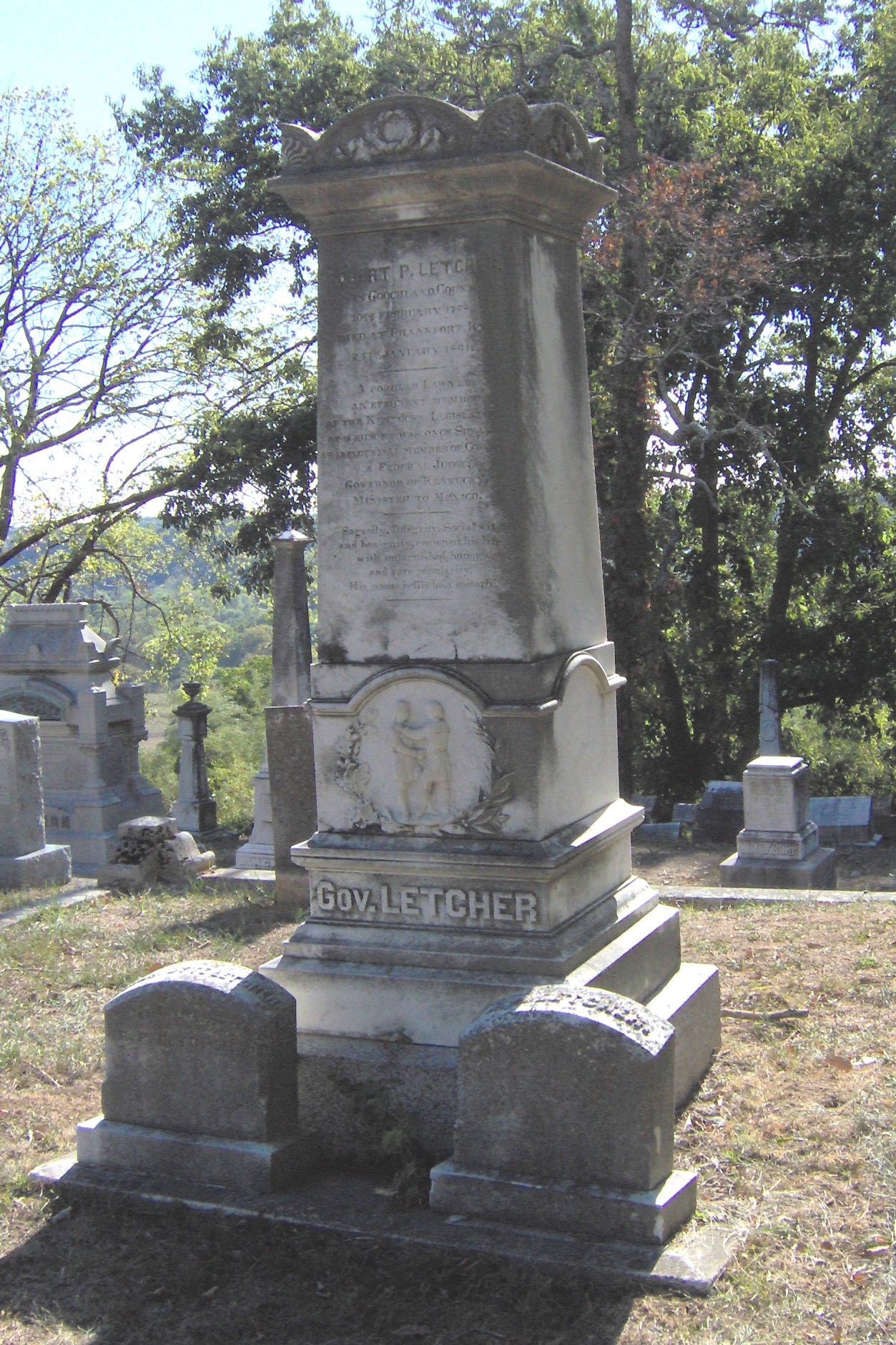
Gov. Robert P. Letcher

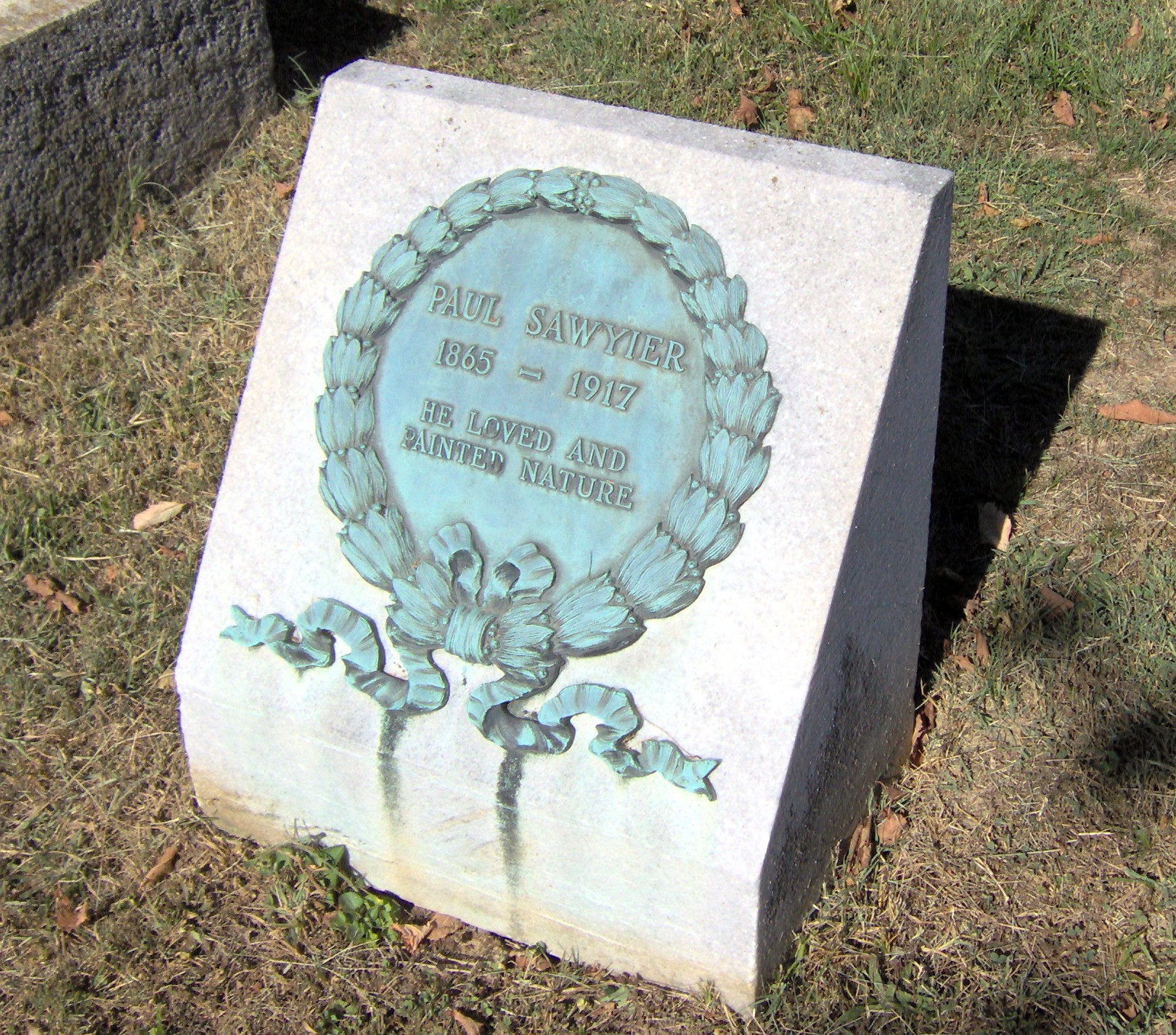
Impressionist painter Paul Sawyier

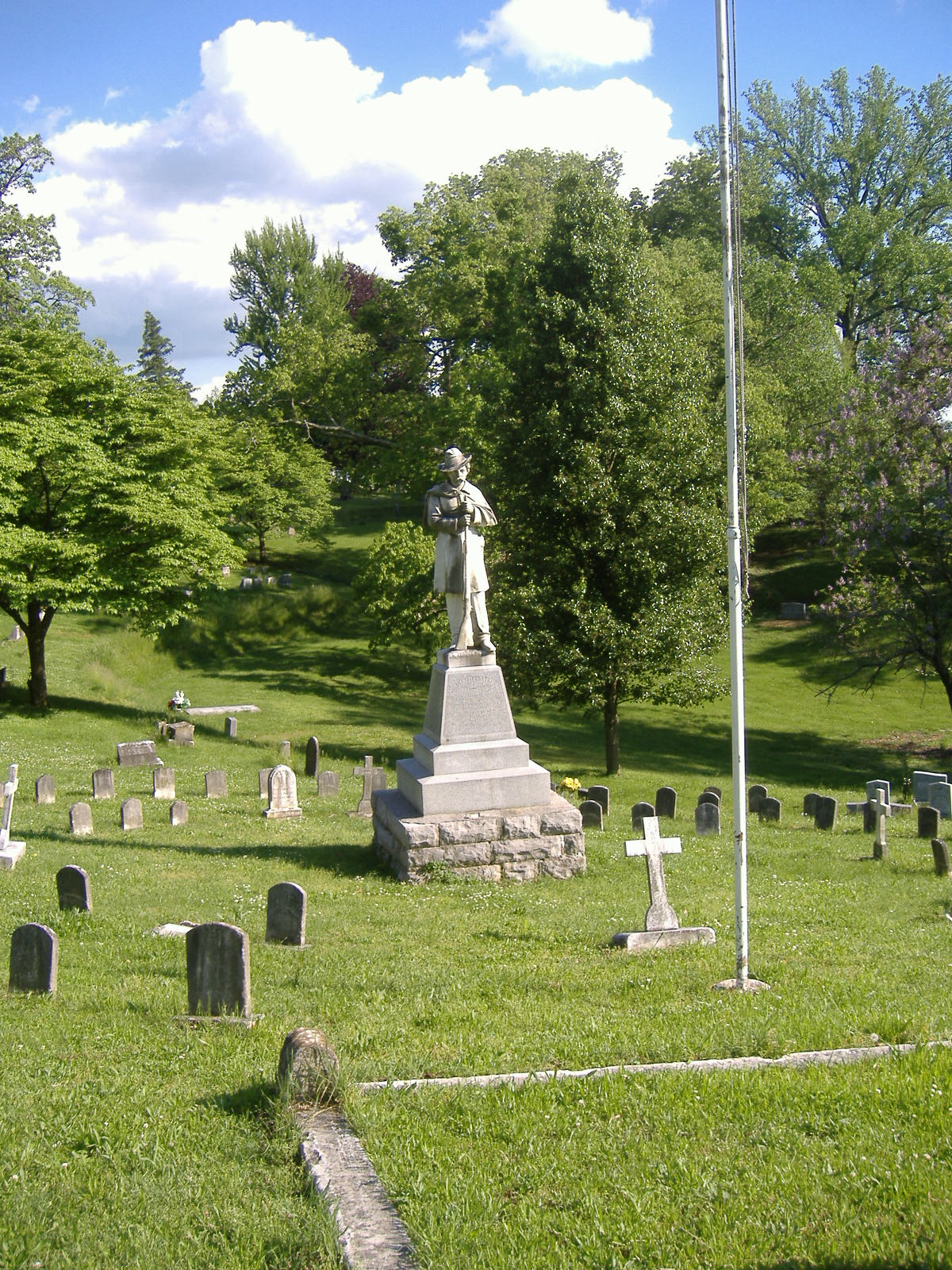
Confederate Monument in Frankfort

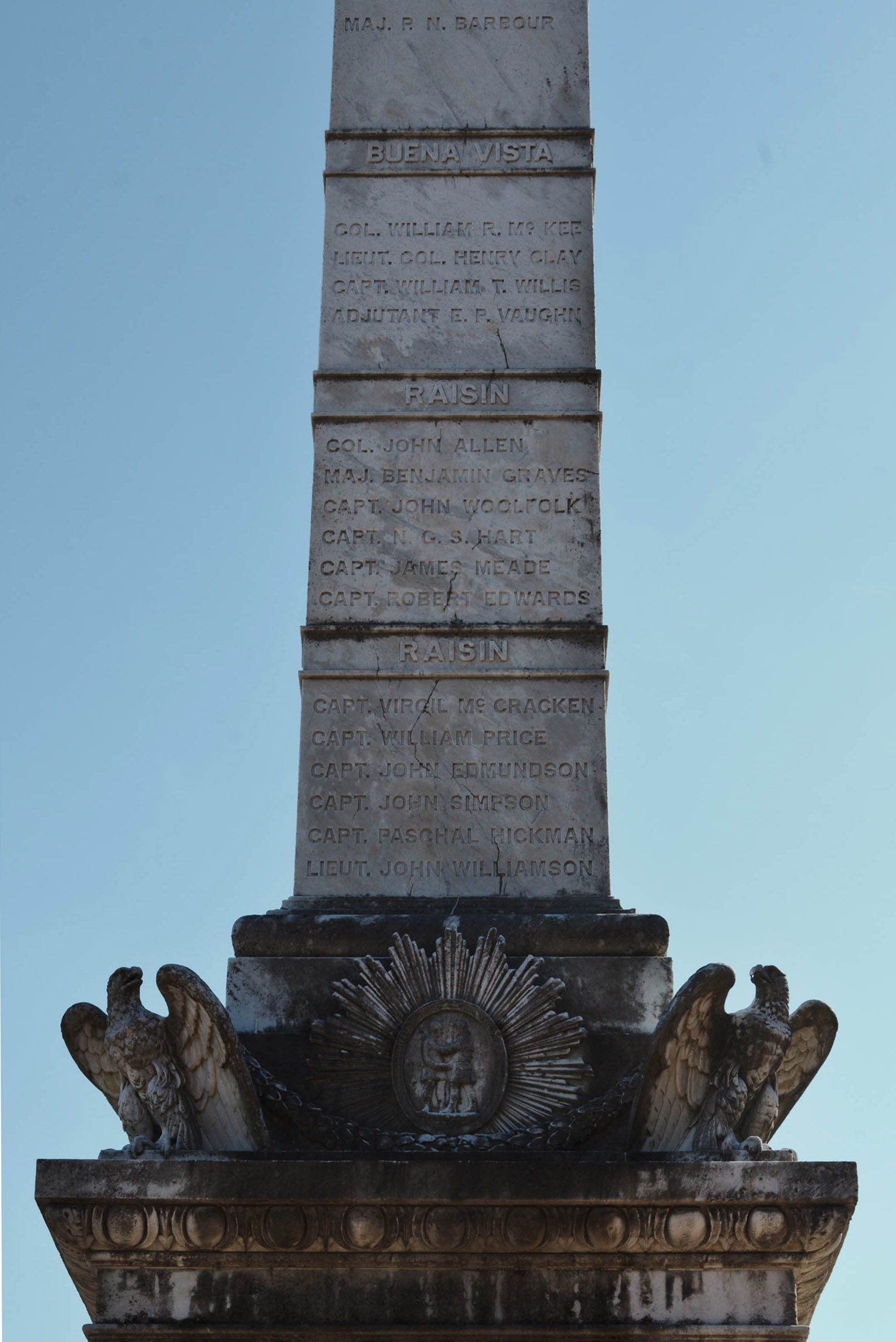
One side of the Kentucky War Memorial

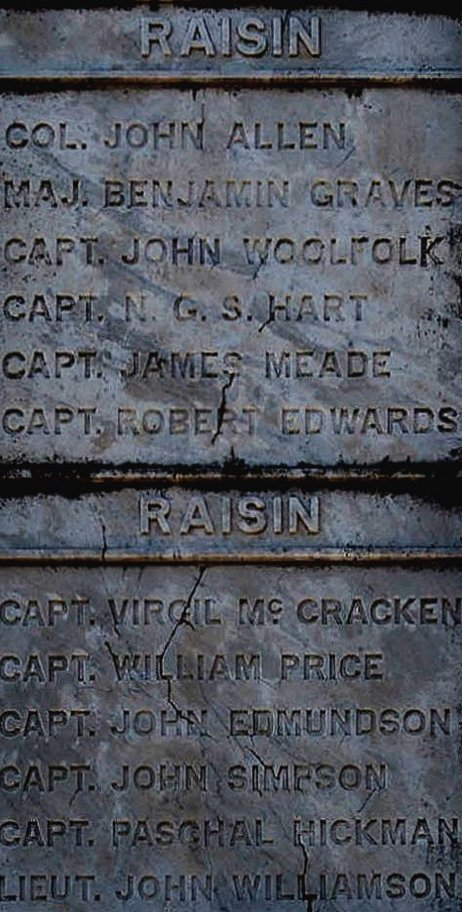
Names of some of the American dead (Raisin River Massacre, War of 1812, Kentucky War Memorial)

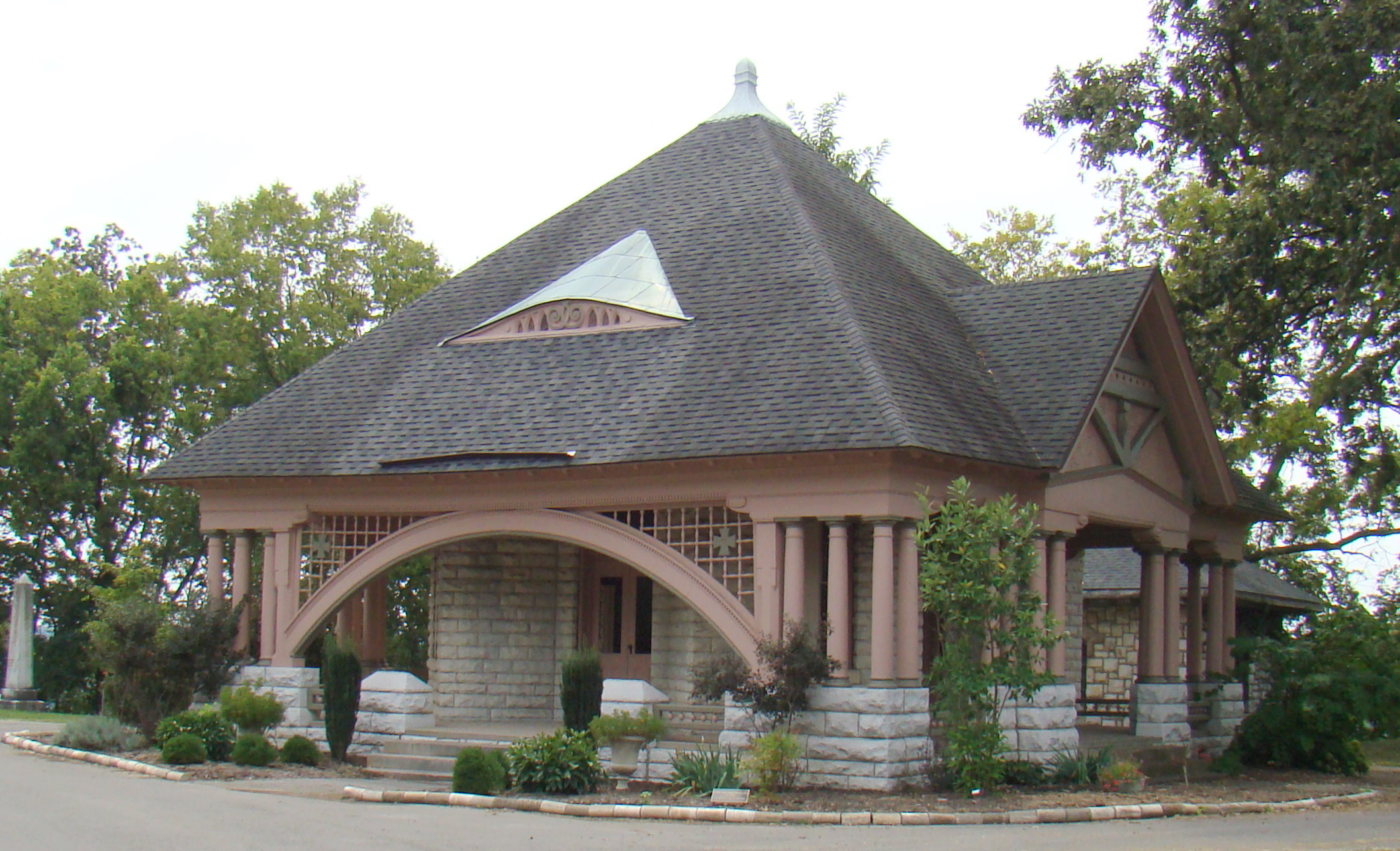
Chapel

== See also ==
- List of burial places of presidents and vice presidents of the United States
- List of burial places of justices of the Supreme Court of the United States
