= William Lewis (militia officer) =

American militia officer (c. 1765–1825)

- Born: c. 1767; Virginia
- Died: January 17, 1825 (aged 58) Pulaski County, Arkansas Territory (present-day Conway Country)
- Allegiance: United States
- Branch: United States Army; Kentucky Militia
- Service years: 1791–1796 (U.S.); 1812–1820 (Ky.)
- Rank: Brigadier General
- Commands: 5th Kentucky Volunteer Infantry
- Conflicts: Northwest Indian War; Battle of the Wabash; Battle of Fallen Timbers; War of 1812; Battle of Frenchtown (POW)

William Lewis (c. 1767–1825) was an American military officer who commanded a regiment of militia at the Battle of Frenchtown during the War of 1812. He previously served as a captain in the United States Army during the Northwest Indian War. Lewis led the detachment that forced the British and their Indigenous allies out of Frenchtown on January 18, 1813, but was taken prisoner during the subsequent engagement on January 22. He was held at Quebec for over a year before being exchanged. After the war he moved from Jessamine County, Kentucky to Arkansas where he died in 1825.

== Early life ==
Lewis was born in Wythe County, Virginia c. 1767. After the American Revolutionary War he migrated to Kentucky and settled in Jessamine County. Lewis held a commission as a lieutenant in the Kentucky militia, and during the Northwest Indian War served as a captain in the Kentucky levies. He survived St. Clair's defeat on November 4, 1791. In March 1792, he was commissioned a captain in the United States Army and in September of that year was assigned to the 3rd Sub-Legion of the Legion of the United States. He fought at the Battle of Fallen Timbers under Major General Anthony Wayne in August 1794 after which he was honourably discharged and returned home to Jessamine County.

== War of 1812 ==
On May 5, 1812, a few weeks before the United States declared war on the United Kingdom, Lewis was commissioned a lieutenant colonel in the Kentucky Militia and appointed to command the 5th Kentucky Volunteer Infantry Regiment. The regiment mustered at Georgetown in August, and with two other regiments marched north under orders to reinforce Brigadier General William Hull at Detroit. Six days later, they reached Newport on the Ohio River across from Cincinnati. Here they received news that Hull had surrendered Detroit to the British.

At Newport, Major General William Henry Harrison took command of the three regiments. Together with the 17th United States Infantry, the Kentucky militia crossed the Ohio River and continued north. At Piqua, they received news that Fort Wayne in the Indiana Territory was under attack by the Potawatomi and Miami. Harrison ordered his combined force to Fort Wayne, intending to relieve the siege.

Aware that American reinforcements were approaching, the Potawatomi and Miami abandoned their attack on September 12. Lewis and his regiment arrived at Fort Wayne later that day. The following day, they joined a detachment tasked with destroying the Miami villages at the Forks of the Wabash River. Four abandoned villages were torched and the crops in the surrounding fields destroyed.

After the relief of Fort Wayne, the 5th Regiment was attached to a column commanded by Brigadier General James Winchester that would proceed to the confluence of the Maumee and Auglaize rivers in preparation for Harrison's campaign to retake Detroit. On September 25, while moving downriver, Winchester's scouts briefly skirmished with a British and Indigenous expedition heading toward Fort Wayne. After learning that he was significantly outnumbered, the British commander, Major Adam Muir, withdrew his force to Fort Amherstburg in Upper Canada.

Winchester's column reached the Auglazie River at the end of September and constructed Fort Winchester near the ruins of Fort Defiance. They received orders to proceed downriver to the Maumee Rapids and wait there for Harrison to arrive with reinforcements before advancing on Detroit. They headed slowly downriver and spent several weeks at an encampment which the men, suffering from a lack of warm clothing and provisions, dubbed "Fort Starvation." They finally arrived at the rapids in early January.

On January 13, Winchester received word that a large quantity of stored grain could be found at Frenchtown, on the River Raisin 38 miles (61 km) to the north. Over the next three days, a few inhabitants of Frenchtown arrived who told Winchester that the settlement was lightly defended by two companies of Upper Canada militia, but wrongly claimed that the British were preparing to burn down the village.

Lewis was among the officers who advocated for an immediate attack. Winchester dispatched Lewis and Lieutenant Colonel John Allen to capture the settlement. They marched over the ice on Maumee Bay to a point a few miles south of Frenchtown. On January 18, during the First Battle of Frenchtown, Lewis and Allen's men charged across the frozen River Raisin in a frontal attack that forced the Upper Canada militia to retreat.

Two days later, Winchester and the 17th Infantry joined Lewis and Allen at Frenchtown. The Americans did little to prepare the position for a possible British counterattack, despite repeated warnings that a large enemy force had crossed the frozen Detroit River and was heading toward the village. Winchester dismissed the reports as "impossible rumour."

On January 22, Colonel Henry Procter, leading a large force of roughly 600 regulars and militia, and supported by an equal number of Indigenous warriors led by Roundhead, retook the settlement during the Second Battle of Frenchtown. The 17th Infantry had been out in the open, and after an intense firefight that lasted about 25 minutes, retreated when Roundhead's warriors surged forward. Lewis and Allen led some of the Kentucky militia out from behind the village's puncheon fence in an attempt to support the regulars but were swept up in the retreat. Winchester, Lewis and Allen tried in vain to rally their men. Panicked men fled across the river, but found their escape blocked by Procter's Indigenous allies. About 220 were killed, including Allen, and 147 men including Winchester and Lewis were taken prisoner.

Meanwhile, the rest of the Kentucky militia held their ground behind the fence. When Winchester and Lewis were brought to the British lines, Procter insisted that the general order the holdouts to surrender. The senior surviving Kentucky militia officer, Major George Madison, initially refused to obey since Winchester and Lewis were prisoners, but soon agreed to terms.

After receiving a false report that Harrison was approaching from the south, Procter ordered an immediate withdrawal, leaving 64 badly wounded prisoners behind under the care of a few attendants. Early on the morning of January 23, about 200 Potawatomi entered the village. They robbed the wounded prisoners of their clothing and blankets, killed those unable to walk, and burned both of the makeshift hospitals. A contemporary report identified nine victims and estimated that an additional 15 to 18 were killed. This number was greatly inflated in later accounts.

Lewis and Winchester were brought to Fort Amherstburg. A few days later they were escorted to Fort George at the mouth of the Niagara River with the rest of the prisoners. While most of the prisoners were immediately paroled and sent across the river to the United States, Lewis and Winchester were sent to Quebec in Lower Canada. Lewis was held prisoner at Quebec for more than a year. He was released in a prisoner exchange in April 1814.

== Later life ==
Lewis returned home to Jessamine County after he was exchanged. He was given command of the 9th Regiment of Kentucky Militia and was later promoted to Brigadier General. He resigned his commission in 1815. In 1819, he migrated with his family to the Arkansas Territory and settled at Pecannerie, a settlement of roughly sixty families on the Arkansas River in Pulaski County. His son, William, died at Pecannerie in 1824, aged about ten, while his daughter, Harriet, married Dr. Nimrod P. Menifee, an iterate dueller and one of the founders of Lewisburg (now Morrilton, Arkansas). Lewis died at his home in Pecannerie on January 17, 1825, at the age of 58.
