= Battle of Frenchtown =

1813 battle of the War of 1812

Battles of Frenchtown
- Part of the War of 1812
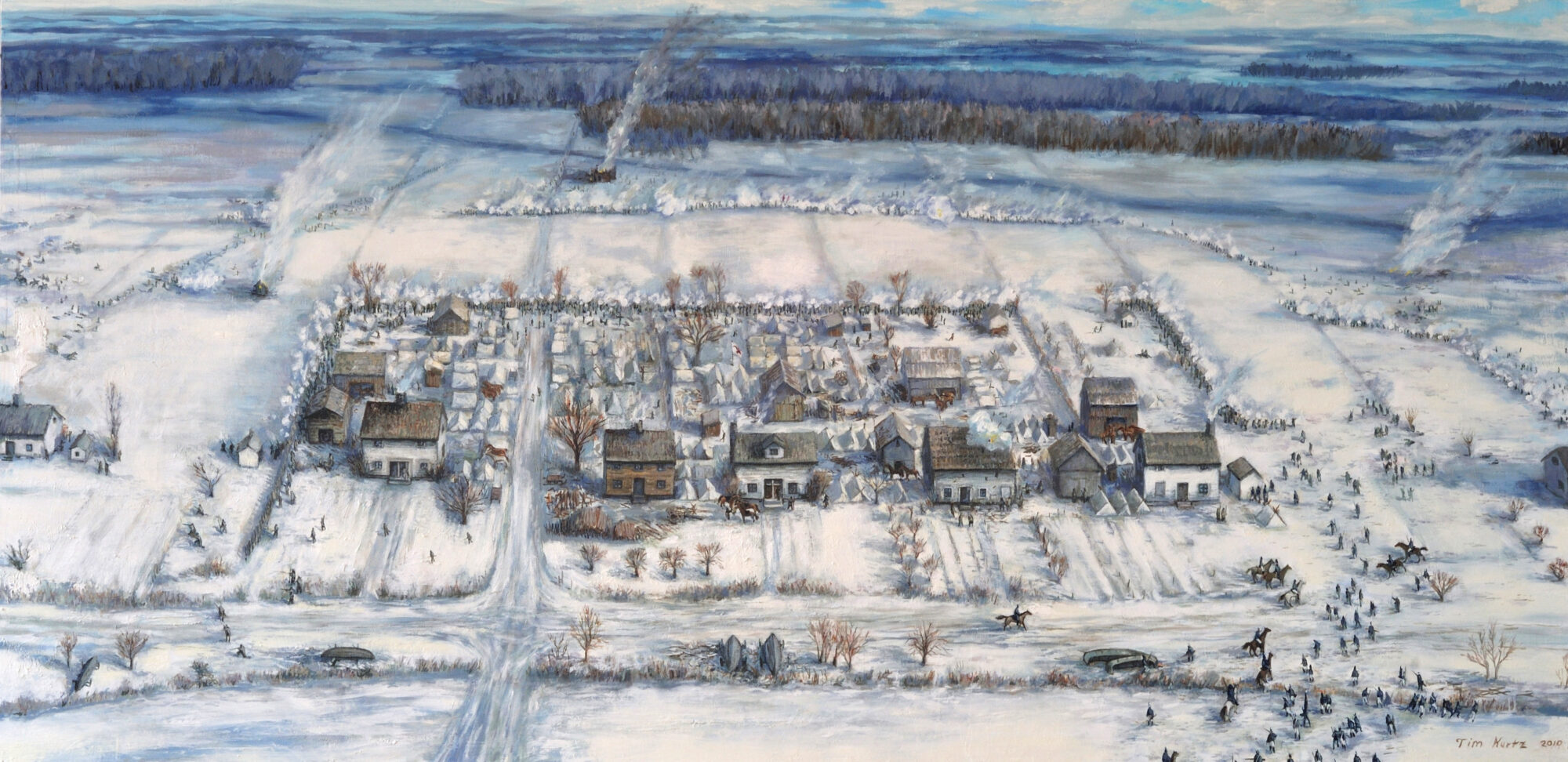
- Battle of the River Raisin by Tim Kurtz
Date	January 18 and 22, 1813
Location	Frenchtown, Michigan Territory (present-day Monroe, Michigan) 41°54′49″N 83°22′42″W
Result	British-Indigenous victory

Belligerents
United Kingdom; Wyandot; Potawatomi	United States

Commanders and leaders
Henry Procter; Roundhead; Walk-in-the-Water	James Winchester (POW); George Madison (POW)

Strength
1,397	1,000

Casualties and losses
40 killed 162 wounded 3 captured	410 killed 94+ wounded 547 captured (30–60 of whom were killed in ensuing Indigenous massacre)

The Battle of Frenchtown, also known as the Battle of the River Raisin and the River Raisin Massacre, refers to two consecutive engagements during the War of 1812. Fighting between American forces commanded by Brigadier General James Winchester and British and allied forces under Colonel Henry Procter took place on January 18 and 22, 1813, at Frenchtown, Michigan Territory (present-day Monroe, Michigan) on the River Raisin roughly 35 miles (56 km) southwest of Detroit.

On January 18, American militia forced the retreat of a British and Indigenous detachment occupying Frenchtown. The attack was part of a larger plan to retake Detroit following its loss after the siege of Detroit the previous summer. Four days later on January 22, the British and their Indigenous allies launched a surprise counterattack. Ill-prepared, the Americans lost 397 soldiers in this second battle, while 547 were taken prisoner. A number of wounded prisoners were murdered the following morning by a group of Indigenous warriors, while a few other prisoners were killed as they were brought to Fort Amherstburg. The Battle of Frenchtown was the deadliest conflict recorded on Michigan soil, and represents the highest number of Americans killed in a single battle during the War of 1812.

Parts of the original battlefield were designated as a state historic park and added to the National Register of Historic Places. In 2009, the United States Congress authorized the creation of the River Raisin National Battlefield Park, one of four such parks in the nation. It is one of only two such parks commemorating the War of 1812, the other one being Chalmette Battlefield and National Cemetery.

== Naming ==
The Battle of Frenchtown took place in and around the Frenchtown Settlement, founded in 1784 on the River Raisin in the Michigan Territory. The land it was fought on is now incorporated into the city of Monroe. Some sources apply the name only to the encounter on January 22, 1813, and refer to the engagement on January 18 as the First Battle of the River Raisin, or simply as a prelude to the larger encounter on January 22. The plural Battles of Frenchtown is also used for the overall conflict from January 18 through 22. While fighting occurred on January 18, the heaviest fighting took place on January 22. The two battles are also known as the Battle of the River Raisin, because of their proximity to that river.

The engagement may be divided into the First Battle of the River Raisin (January 18) and the Second Battle of the River Raisin (January 22). The term "River Raisin Massacre" is used to describe the events of January 23, the day after the second battle, when Indigenous warriors killed a number of wounded American prisoners who the British had left behind when they withdrew from Frenchtown.

== Background ==
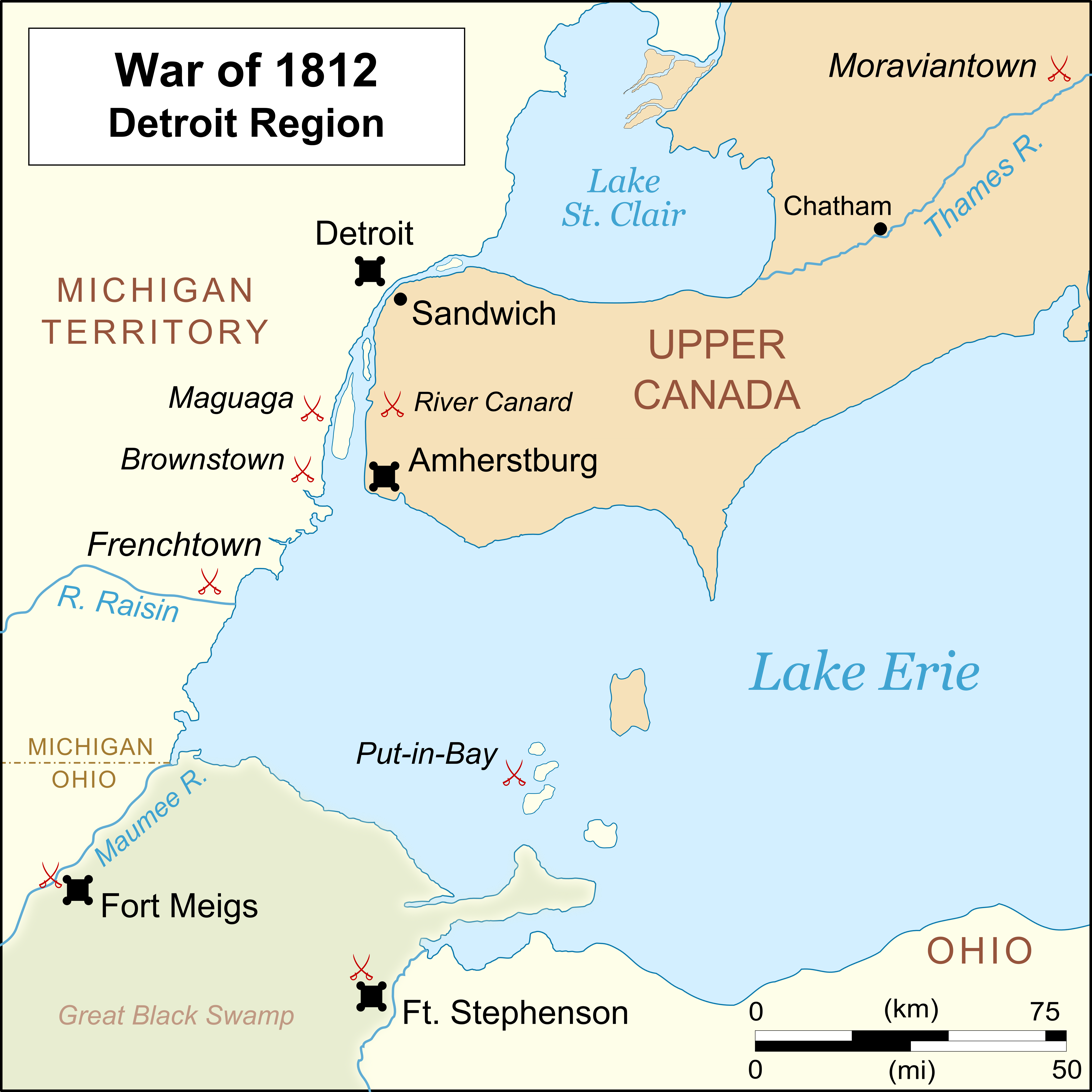
Battles and locations in the Detroit region during the War of 1812

On August 17, 1812, Brigadier General William Hull, commanding the American Army of the Northwest, surrendered his army, Detroit and the Michigan Territory to the British following the siege of Detroit. This early success encouraged many Indigenous leaders in the Indiana and Illinois territories to side with the British during the war.

Following Hull's defeat, Brigadier General James Winchester assumed command of the Army of the Northwest. He was soon replaced by Major General William Henry Harrison with Winchester as his second-in-command. Winchester was asked to lead 1,200 regulars and militia from Fort Wayne to the Maumee Rapids (present-day Perrysburg, Ohio). Meanwhile, Harrison would assemble additional men and supplies at Upper Sandusky, before joining Winchester at the rapids and advancing on Detroit.

British forces in the Detroit area were commanded by Colonel Henry Procter. In December 1813, Procter's division consisted of 270 men from the 41st Regiment of Foot, 70 men from the Royal Newfoundland Regiment, 25 artillerymen, and a small support staff. Most were based at Amherstburg, however, 114 men under Captain Adam Muir garrisoned Detroit. Procter could also draw upon men from the Essex militia and the Provincial Marine.

Supporting the British were the Wyandot, Potawatomi, Odawa and Ojibwe who lived in the area. Amherstburg was also home to about 800 Indigenous refugees whose villages had been destroyed by Harrison's forces in September 1812.

== First Battle of the River Raisin ==
First Battle of the River Raisin
- Part of the War of 1812
Date	January 18, 1813
Location	Frenchtown, Michigan Territory (present-day Monroe, Michigan) 41°54′49″N 83°22′42″W
Result	American victory

Belligerents
(United Kingdom of Great Britain and Ireland) United Kingdom; Potawatomi	United States

Commanders and leaders
Ebenezer Reynolds	William Lewis; John Allen

Strength
100-200 Potawatomi; 50 Essex militia	680 Kentucky militia

Casualties and losses
1 militia and 15 Potawatomi killed 2 militia and one Potawatomi captured	12 killed 55 wounded

On January 10, 1813, Winchester arrived at the Maumee Rapids with roughly 1,300 regulars and Kentucky militia. His orders were to wait at the rapids for Harrison to arrive with reinforcements from Upper Sandusky before advancing on Detroit. On January 13, two residents of Frenchtown, roughly 35 miles (56 km) north of the rapids, arrived with a letter from a local merchant informing Winchester that the British had learned that the Americans were at the rapids. The letter further stated that 3000 barrels of wheat and flour were in storage at Frenchtown. Over the next three days, other habitants from the River Raisin settlement arrived who told Winchester that Frenchtown was occupied by two companies of militia and about 200 Indigenous warriors, but wrongly claimed that the British were preparing to burn down the village.

After meeting with his officers, Winchester decided to send Lieutenant Colonel William Lewis with 570 Kentucky militiamen to Frenchtown. Lewis was later joined by Lieutenant Colonel John Allen with an additional 110 men. Lewis and Allen proceeded to the mouth of the Maumee River, then followed the frozen shoreline of Lake Erie northwards. By mid-afternoon on January 18, Lewis and Allen reached the south side of the River Raisin where a number of the French-speaking habitants of the settlement joined them.

Opposing the Americans, and protected by the settlement's houses, barns and fences, were 50 men of the Essex Militia led by Major Ebenezer Reynolds. The militia was supported by a single 3-inch howitzer and between 100 and 200 Potawatomi and Wyandot warriors.

When Reynolds opened fire with the howitzer, Lewis ordered a charge across the frozen river and into the village. They quickly forced the militia and Indigenous warriors to retreat. According to one source, at this point "the habitants sallied out of their houses, arms in hand, and attacked the straggling Indians." The Essex Militia briefly held their ground at the edge of the woods north of village. An attempt by Lewis to outflank them failed as Reynolds pulled his men into the forest where they engaged in a fighting withdrawal. Many years later Robert Reynolds recalled that his brother's men "fought most bravely, [as they] retired slowly from log to log."

William Atherton, a rifleman in Allen's detachment, published an account of his experiences in 1842. Atherton, who was wounded in the right shoulder during the engagement, described the Essex militia's tactics:

Their method was to retreat rapidly until they were out of sight, (which was soon the case in the brushy woods,) and while we were advancing they were preparing to give us another fire; so we were generally under the necessity of firing upon them as they were retreating.

Lewis and Allen continued their pursuit of Reynolds until nightfall, then pulled back to Frenchtown. The Essex militia and Potawatomi had inflicted significant casualties on the Americans. Lewis reported 12 Americans killed and 55 wounded (two fatally). Meanwhile, the Essex militia suffered only a single casualty. Lewis also reported that two militiamen and one Potawatomi had been captured, and that at least 15 warriors had been killed.

North of Frenchtown, two habitants of the Sandy Creek settlement, René LaBeau and Jean-Baptiste Solo, were murdered after Solo taunted the retreating Potowatomi. Two of LaBeau's children ran 2½ miles to Frenchtown, seeking the protection of the American army. Lewis subsequently ordered the Sandy Creek settlement abandoned.

== Second Battle of the River Raisin ==
Second Battle of the River Raisin
- Part of the War of 1812
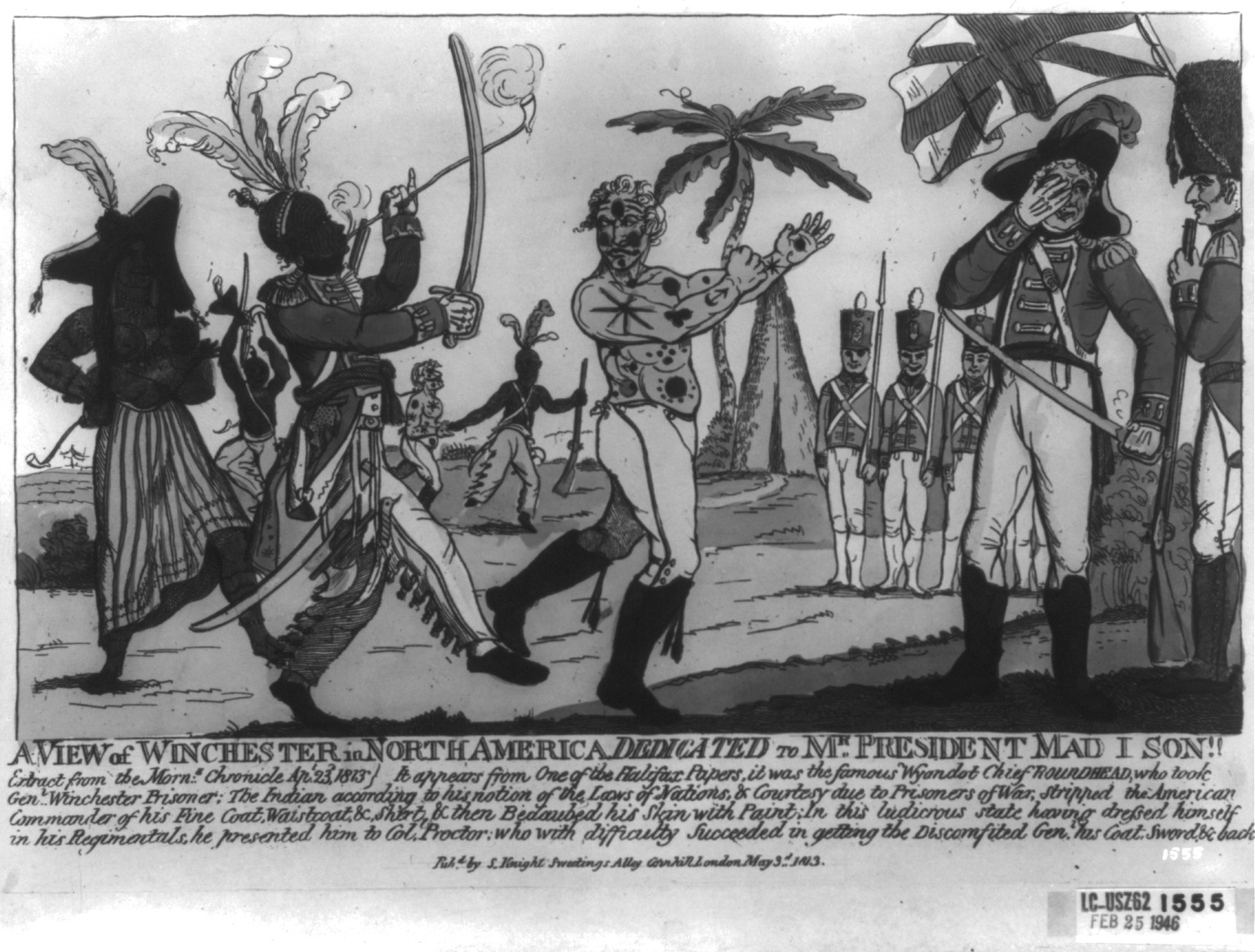
- British political cartoon depicting Roundhead escorting Brigadier General Winchester to Colonel Procter
Date	January 22, 1813
Location	Frenchtown, Michigan Territory (present-day Monroe, Michigan) 41°54′49″N 83°22′42″W
Result	British and Indigenous victory

Belligerents
(United Kingdom of Great Britain and Ireland) United Kingdom; Tecumseh's confederacy	United States

Commanders and leaders
(United Kingdom of Great Britain and Ireland) Henry Procter; Roundhead; Walk-in-the-Water	(United States) James Winchester (United States) William Lewis (POW) (United States) John Allen † (United States) George Madison

Strength
600 Indigenous; 597 British	934 Americans

Casualties and losses
British; 24 killed 161 wounded Indigenous; Unknown	397 killed 547 captured

On January 19, after receiving the news that Frenchtown had been taken, Winchester set out for the River Raisin with 50 militia volunteers and 250 regulars from the 17th and 19th United States Infantry Regiments, leaving behind a rear guard of 300 men. They reached Frenchtown the following day, increasing Winchester's effective force at the River Raisin to 934 men. Although Winchester had disobeyed his orders, Harrison was pleased with Lewis's success. He immediately set out for the Maumee Rapids with reinforcements, and dispatched a messenger to Winchester ordering him "to hold the ground."

At Amherstburg, Colonel Henry Procter, commander of British forces on the Detroit frontier, learned of Reynolds's defeat in the early hours of January 19. He dispatched a company of the 41st Regiment of Foot, a detachment of the Royal Artillery, and a detachment of the Provincial Marine across the Detroit River to Brownstown where they linked up with Reynolds's men. The following day they were joined by additional men from the 41st Regiment, the Royal Newfoundland Regiment of Fencible Infantry and the Essex Militia. Procter's combined force of 597 men included 335 regulars, 212 militiamen and 19 members of the Indian Department. His artillery consisted of three small howitzers and three 3-pounder guns drawn on sleds and manned by men from the Royal Artillery and Provincial Marine.

About 600 warriors led by the Wyandot war leader Roundhead joined the British at Brownstown. The Indigenous contingent consisted mainly of warriors from the Wyandot, Potawatomi, Odawa, Ojibwe, and Shawnee but representatives of several other tribes were also present.

Winchester established his headquarters at the home of Francois Navarre a mile south of the village. On the evening of January 21, several of the habitants of Frenchtown reported that a large British force was heading towards the settlement. Winchester ignored their warnings and took no precautions, insisting it would be "some days" before the British "would be ready to do anything." He declined to send out patrols or establish pickets. Most of his men were encamped inside the village and protected on three sides by a puncheon fence. The regulars of the 17th and 19th U.S. Infantry, however, were encamped out in the open in a field east of the village.

On January 21, Procter's combined force advanced to Stony Creek about 4 miles (6.4 km) north of the River Raisin where they bivouacked overnight. They arrived at Frenchtown before dawn on January 22. He silently deployed his regulars into line about 250 yards (230 m) north of the village. The Odawa, Ojibwe, Potawatomi were loosely clustered on Procter's right, while the Wyandot and Shawnee positioned themselves northeast of the regular's encampment. Procter sent two of his artillery pieces with a militia detachment to a field west the village. He kept one gun in reserve while the other three were positioned to the front of the line. The remaining militia took position near the Wyandot and Shawnee.

As Procter prepared to attack, an American drummer began beating reveille. A sentry posted outside the fence spotted the British and fired his weapon, killing a British soldier. Two other sentries also discharged their weapons. As the Kentucky militia scrambled into position behind the fence, the British artillery opened fire but overshot their targets. The 41st and Royal Newfoundland moved to within musket range, loosed a thunderous volley, then continued advancing on the village. Protected by the puncheon fence, the Kentucky militiamen were largely unscathed, and inflicted heavy casualties as they drove back the British assault.

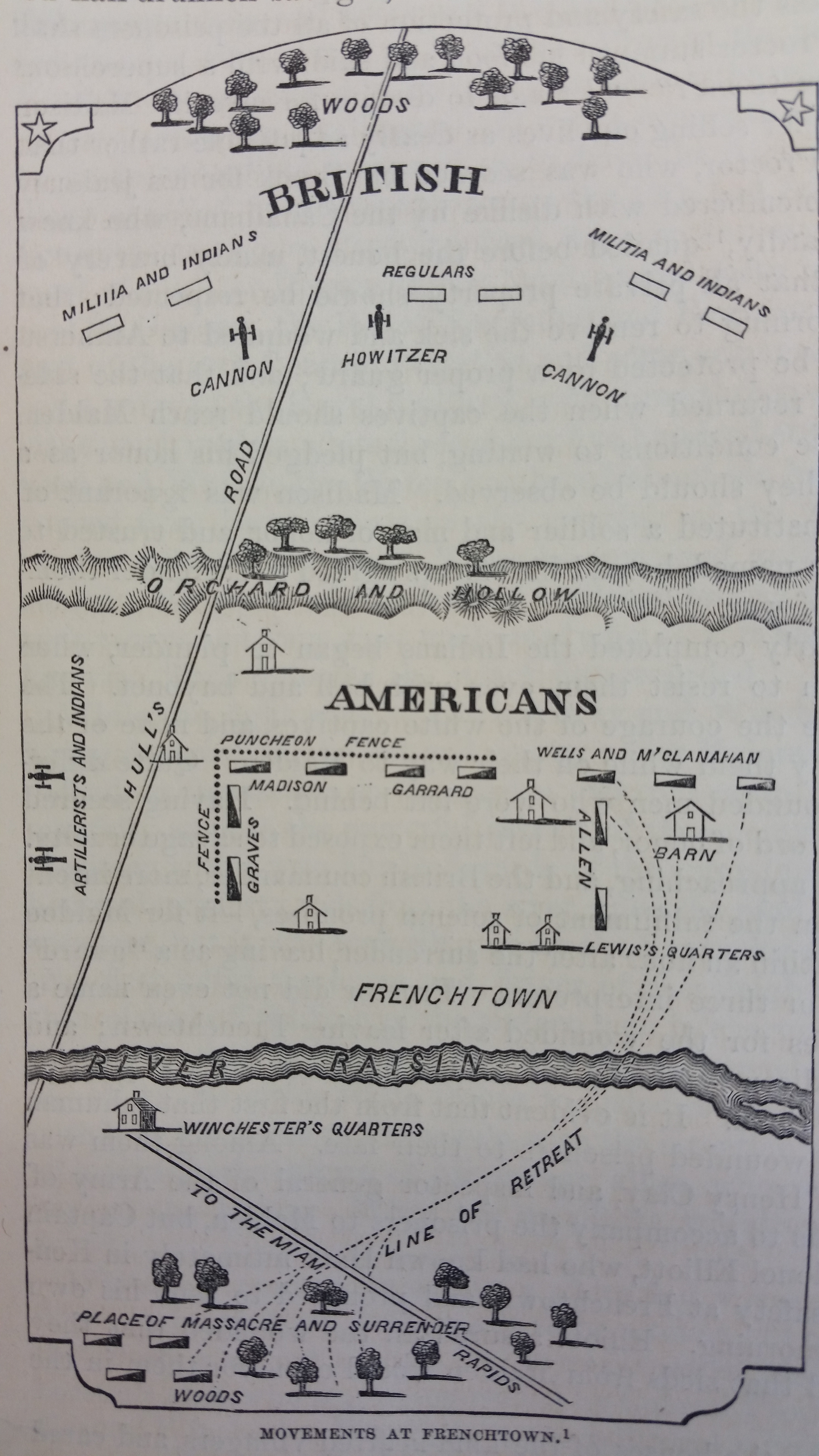
Map depicting the positions of American and the British-Indigenous force during the second battle.

Meanwhile, the Wyandot, Shawnee and militia attacked the exposed American regulars east of the village. The 17th and 19th U.S. Infantry struggled to hold their position as musket and artillery fire tore through their encampment. Allen led several companies of Kentucky from the village in an unsuccessful attempt to reinforce them. Winchester, who had arrived on the scene with Lewis, ordered Allen and the regulars to fall back to river. An attempt to make a stand failed, and with the Wyandot and Shawnee in pursuit, the Americans began fleeing across the frozen River Raisin. A second futile attempt was made on the south side of the river to hold back the enemy. Winchester, Allen, Lewis were swept up in the ensuing chaos as their men desperately tried to escape.

Chased by the Wyandot and Shawnee, many of the fleeing Americans were overtaken and killed. Dozens who laid down their weapons in surrender were tomahawked and scalped. Those that managed to outrun their pursuers soon found their escape route blocked by the Potawatomi, Odawa and Ojibwe who had swept around from the west and taken position at Plum Creek about a mile south of the River Raisin. Of the roughly 400 Americans that were caught up in the rout, about 220 were killed including Allen, and another 147 were captured. Only 33 managed to escape to the Maumee River.

Winchester and Lewis were captured south of Plum Creek by a group of Wyandot. Winchester was relieved of his sword, pistol, overcoat and cocked hat, then taken to Roundhead. Roundhead took the general's sword and donned his waistcoat, then brought Winchester and Lewis to Proctor.

Meanwhile, the remainder of the Kentucky militia, now under the command of Major George Madison, continued to hold out behind the puncheon fence, aided by a number of the habitants. Having suffered relatively few casualties, they repulsed two more frontal assaults and succeeded in taking a heavy toll on the British artillery crews and infantry. After the failure of the third frontal assault, Procter ordered his regulars to withdraw and regroup behind a group of farm buildings on the far left. To deny the British the protection of a barn, Ensign William Butler twice ran to the wooden structure to set it on fire. While his clothes were riddled with bullets, he succeeded in destroying the barn and returned unharmed to his lines.

During a lull in the fighting, Roundtree arrived with Winchester. Procter demanded that Winchester order his men to surrender unconditionally. Winchester argued that he was a prisoner and could not give orders to those still fighting. When Procter suggested that his Indigenous allies would burn the village and kill all within, Winchester agreed to send a letter encouraging the Kentucky militia to surrender. Despite the pleas of some of his men, Madison agreed to capitulate after he had negotiated terms regarding the treatment of prisoners, protection from Britain's Indigenous allies, and the care of the wounded. The alternative, he later wrote, was "to be murdered in cold blood."

The day following the battle, Winchester reported that the British had taken 522 prisoners with others still in Indigenous hands. A more detailed report two weeks later recorded 397 killed and 547 captured. Procter's forces also sustained heavy losses with 24 killed and 161 wounded. Most of the casualties were from the 41st Regiment with 18 killed and 129 wounded. Indigenous casualties are not known.

== Massacre ==
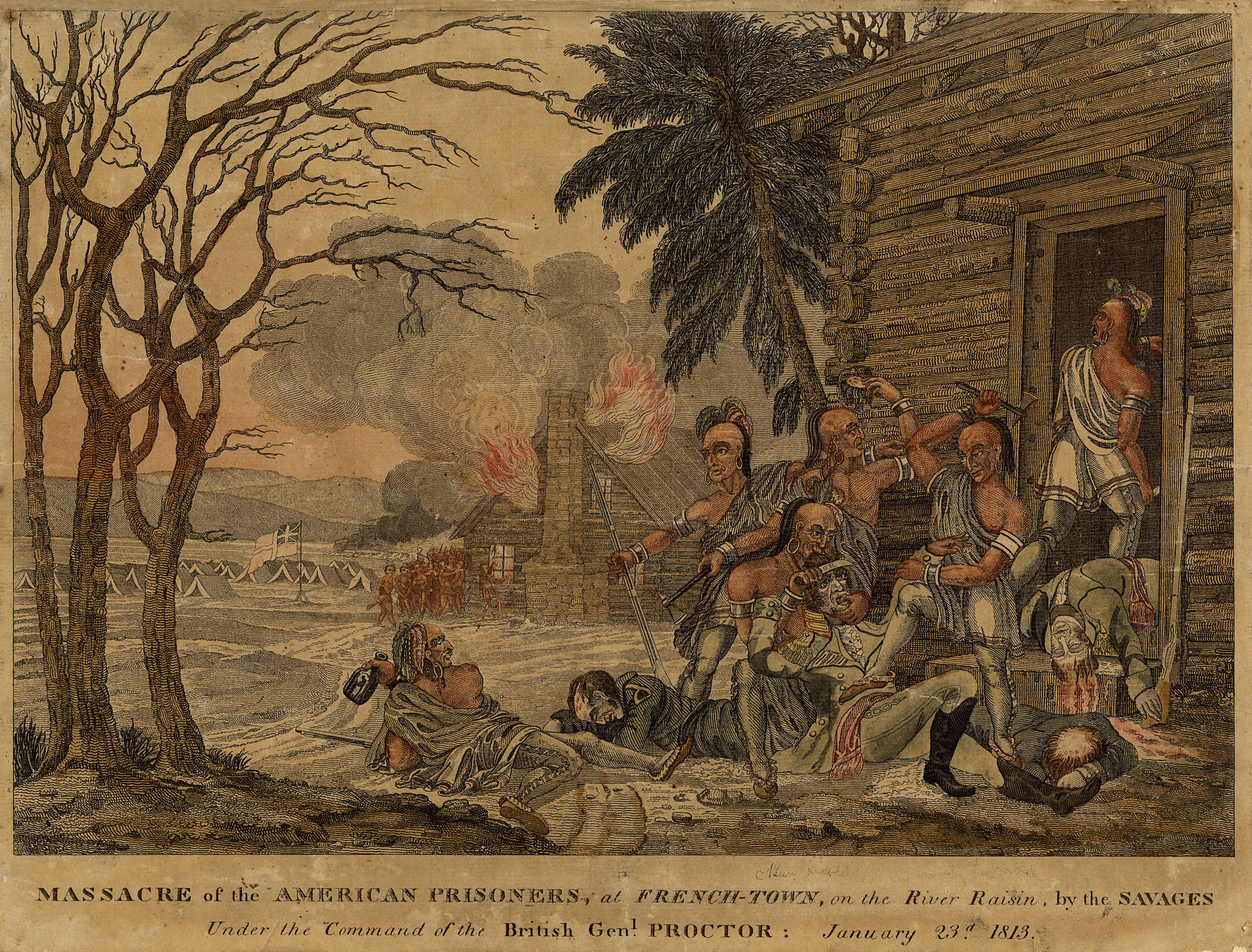
Massacre of American Prisoners at French-town on the River Raisin. This print received wide circulation through recruiting posters issued by the United States War Department. (Clements Library, University of Michigan)

Shortly after the surrender, Procter received a credible but false report that Harrison was less than 8 miles (13 km) away. He ordered an immediate retreat but, due to a shortage of sleighs, was forced to leave the severely wounded prisoners behind. The wounded were quartered in two of the village's homes. Tending them were American surgeon Doctor John Todd, surgeon's mate Gustavus Bower, and a number of able-bodied volunteers. The only British personnel with the prisoners were two officers from the Essex militia and three interpreters from the Indian Department, all of whom left the village before dawn. The exact number of wounded prisoners is not known, with contemporary accounts reporting as few as 48 or as many as 80.

Procter arrived back at Amherstburg at midnight. No shelter was provided for the American prisoners that had accompanied the British until the following morning. A few days after the battle, most of these prisoners were marched off under guard to Fort George at the mouth of the Niagara River. Once they arrived, most of them were paroled and sent across the river to Fort Niagara. Winchester and his senior officers were sent on to Quebec.

On the morning of January 23, 100 to 200 Indigenous warriors returned to Frenchtown. They entered the makeshift hospitals and robbed the wounded of their clothing and blankets. They killed those unable to walk, forced the remainder outside, and burned the two buildings. The survivors were taken away but any who struggled to keep up with their captors were killed. Most were brought to Amherstburg or Detroit and ransomed. Others escaped or were ransomed weeks or even months later. A few may have been tortured to death while some of the younger prisoners were adopted into Indigenous families and never returned.

Elias Darnell, whose brother Allen was among the wounded, wrote:

The road was, for miles, strewed with the mangled bodies, and all of them were left like those slain in battle, on the 22d, for birds and beasts to tear in pieces and devour. In travelling about one quarter of a mile, two of the wounded lagged behind about twenty yards. The Indians, turning round, shot one and scalped him. They shot the other and missed him, he, running up to them, begged they would not shoot him. He said he would keep up, and give them money. But these murderers were not moved with his doleful cries. They shot him down; and, rushing on him in a crowd, scalped him. In like manner my brother Allen perished.

Many accounts refer to "drunken Indians" having committed the murders, however, this is disputed. According to Todd: "Whiskey was not the cause of the massacre. Their deliberate pilfering, and their orderly conduct throughout was not such as would be expected from drunken Indians." More likely, the warriors were seeking retribution for depredations committed by the Kentucky "Long Knives" during attacks on Potowatomi and Miami villages a few months earlier, and the desecration of Indigenous corpses following the battle on the 19th.

There is considerable uncertainty about the extent of the massacre due to discrepancies in the accounts provided by survivors and habitants. A few accounts claimed that wounded prisoners were burned alive when the two houses were set on fire, and that those who attempted to escape the flames were tomahawked and scalped. Another claimed that some of those who had been sent outside were scalped alive and thrown into the flames.

Procter later ordered an American prisoner, Ensign Isaac Baker, to determine the extent of the massacre. Baker initially identified nine victims and estimated that an additional 15 to 18 had been killed. He later added the names of four officers to the total. In an account published in the Weekly Register after he was exchanged, Baker inflated the number of the dead to 60, and further claimed that multiple murders occurred in the three days following the 23rd.

== Aftermath ==
The Battle of Frenchtown is widely known as the "Raisin River Massacre." Reports of the slaughter on the morning of the 23rd were quickly exaggerated in wartime propaganda, with political cartoons and recruitment broadsides depicting a drunken massacre and scalping by “savages” abetted by the British. The slogan "Remember the Raisin!" was used to encourage enlistment, and was adopted as a battle cry, notably at the Battle of the Thames.

In a letter to the Secretary of War, Harrison called Winchester's defeat a "national calamity." Harrison had arrived at the Maumee Rapids with reinforcements on January 20 and had ordered Winchester's rear guard to proceed to the River Raisin. A body of 200 Ohio militia had earlier been dispatched from Lower Sandusky. On the morning of the battle, both reinforcements were within 15 miles (24 km) of Frenchtown when they encountered some of the habitants who had fled when the fighting started. Word was sent to Harrison who hurried forward. Some of the soldiers who had escaped the battlefield arrived and were debriefed by Harrison. One soldier claimed to have seen Winchester scalped and disembowelled. After conferring with his staff, Harrison ordered all reinforcements to turn back, but left a detachment behind to assist other fugitives from the battle.

Harrison ordered Winchester's stores at the rapids burned, and pulled his forces back to the Portage River, eighteen miles to the east. A month later he returned to the Maumee River and began construction of a substantial fortification which he named Fort Meigs. He received orders to suspend offensive operations until the warships being constructed at Black Rock and Erie were ready to sail and provide support for another attempt to retake Detroit.

Winchester was held prisoner at Quebec in Lower Canada for more than a year. He was released in an exchange in April 1814 and later assigned to command the District of Mobile.

The first published reports of the massacre appeared in American newspapers soon after the prisoners were paroled back to the United States. In his account, Isaac Baker described how the "dead bodies of my fellow comrades, scalped, tomahawked and stripped, presented a most horrid spectacle to my view." He further suggested that "some of the wounded had been scalped alive and burnt in the houses." In his introduction to Baker's "narrative of horrid butchery", the publisher of the Weekly Register, Hezekiah Niles, declared that the British not only "instigated and armed the savage monsters" but encouraged them "by purchasing the scalps of our murdered citizens."

In May 1813, the United States Congress formed a committee to document and expose alleged atrocities committed by British forces and their Indigenous allies. The result, a report titled Barbarities of the Enemy, was published in serial form in newspapers as well as in book form. The report contained more than a dozen first and second-hand accounts of the massacre and was used by American politicians as a propaganda tool to galvanize public opinion and generate support for a war that had become increasingly unpopular.

Sandy Antal, author of A Wampum Denied: Procter's War of 1812, notes that American writers have "persistently demonized" the British commander. Benson Lossing's 1868 Pictorial History of the War of 1812, for example, vilified Procter as a "inhuman officer" who directed or permitted the murder of American prisoners. In his Second War with England, Joel Headley claimed that Procter "gave unbridled license" to his allies, who "were allowed to scalp and mutilate the dead and wounded, whose bleeding corpses crimsoned the snow on every side." These claims reflect the false belief that Britain's Indigenous allies were under the control of British officers who were more than willing to encourage or at least accept barbarity.

Meanwhile, Canadian historians have focused on Procter's shortcomings as a military commander. Procter was held culpable in the murders only because he failed in his responsibility to protect prisoners of war after they had surrendered. Writing in 1899, Ernest Cruikshank declared Procter guilty of "indecision and unpardonable negligence." A century later, J. Mackay Hitsman wrote that of all the British generals "only Procter managed to blunder consistently."

At the time, British authorities lauded Procter for his victory over the Americans. Lieutenant General Sir George Prevost, the Governor General of the Canadas, praised the colonel's "singular judgment and decisive conduct," while Major General Roger Hale Sheaffe commended Procter for his "judgment and promptitude." The legislative assemblies of both Upper and Lower Canada gave Procter a unanimous vote of thanks. Procter was appointed a brigadier general in February 1813, and a few months later was promoted to major general.

In a letter to Sheaffe, Proctor acknowledged that his Indigenous allies had murdered wounded prisoners: "There have been some instances I am sorry to say of Indian barbarity, but the example was set by the Enemy... I know we shall be vilified for the truth is not in them."

In September 1813, the American victory at the Battle of Lake Erie severed the British supply line and forced Procter to abandon Amherstburg and Detroit. He retreated east along the Thames River, pursued by American forces, roughly 3,500 strong, commanded by Harrison. Procter made a stand a few miles west of Moraviantown but was defeated at the Battle of the Thames when Harrison's mounted infantry overran the British lines. At his court martial a year later, Procter was found to have been "erroneous in judgment and deficient in energy" during the retreat. The conviction ended Procter's military career.

== Legacy and honors ==
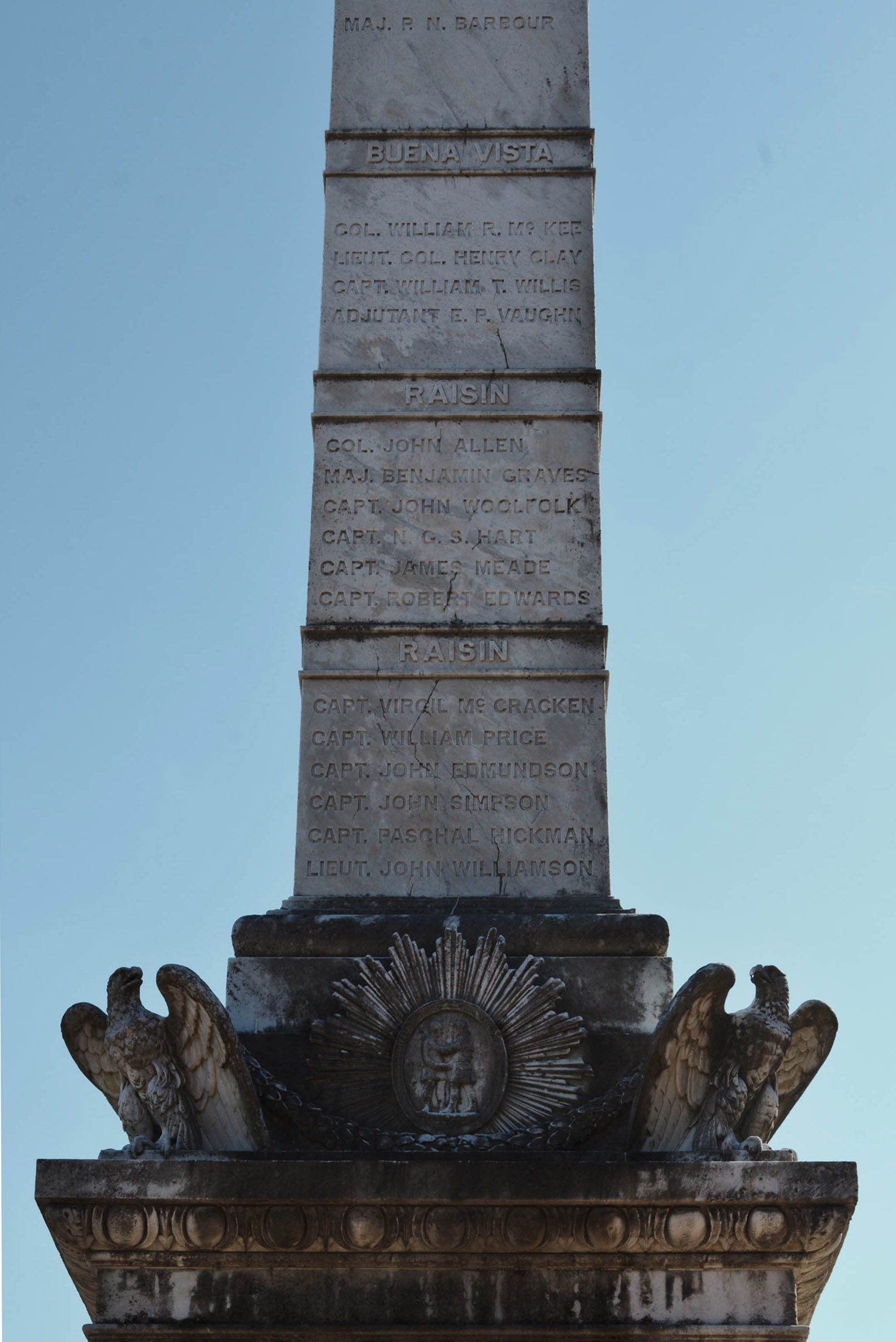
Names of 12 of the American officers killed at the Battle of Frenchtown appear on the Kentucky War Memorial in Frankfort, Kentucky.

Nine counties in Kentucky are named for officers who fought in the Battle of Frenchtown, only one of who, Major Bland Ballard survived the engagement:

- Allen County (after Lieutenant Colonel John Allen)
- Ballard County (after Major Bland Ballard)
- Edmonson County (after Captain John Edmonson)
- Graves County (after Major Benjamin Franklin Graves (soldier))
- Hart County (after Captain Nathaniel Hart)
- Hickman County (after Captain Paschal Hickman)
- McCracken County (after Captain Virgil McCracken)
- Meade County (after Captain James M. Meade)
- Simpson County (after Captain John Simpson)

A number of streets in Monroe memorialize the Battle of Frenchtown, including Kentucky Avenue and Winchester Street.

The Kentucky War Memorial in Frankfort, Kentucky records the names of 12 of the American officers who died at the Battle of Frenchtown.

In 1904, the state of Michigan erected a monument in Monroe south of the river to mark the site where the unidentified remains of victims of the River Raisin Massacre were buried. The monument is located at the intersection of South Monroe Street and West 7th Street. That same year, the Civil Improvement Society of the Women of Monroe erected an obelisk north of the river to mark the site of the battle. This marker mistakenly states that the Americans "fought desperately against 3000 British and Allies under Gen. Proctor."

The battlefield was added to the National Register of Historic Places in 1982. In March 2009, the United States Congress authorized the creation of River Raisin National Battlefield Park. The park became operational in October 2010. It is one of only four National Battlefield Parks in the United States, and the only one to commemorate the War of 1812.

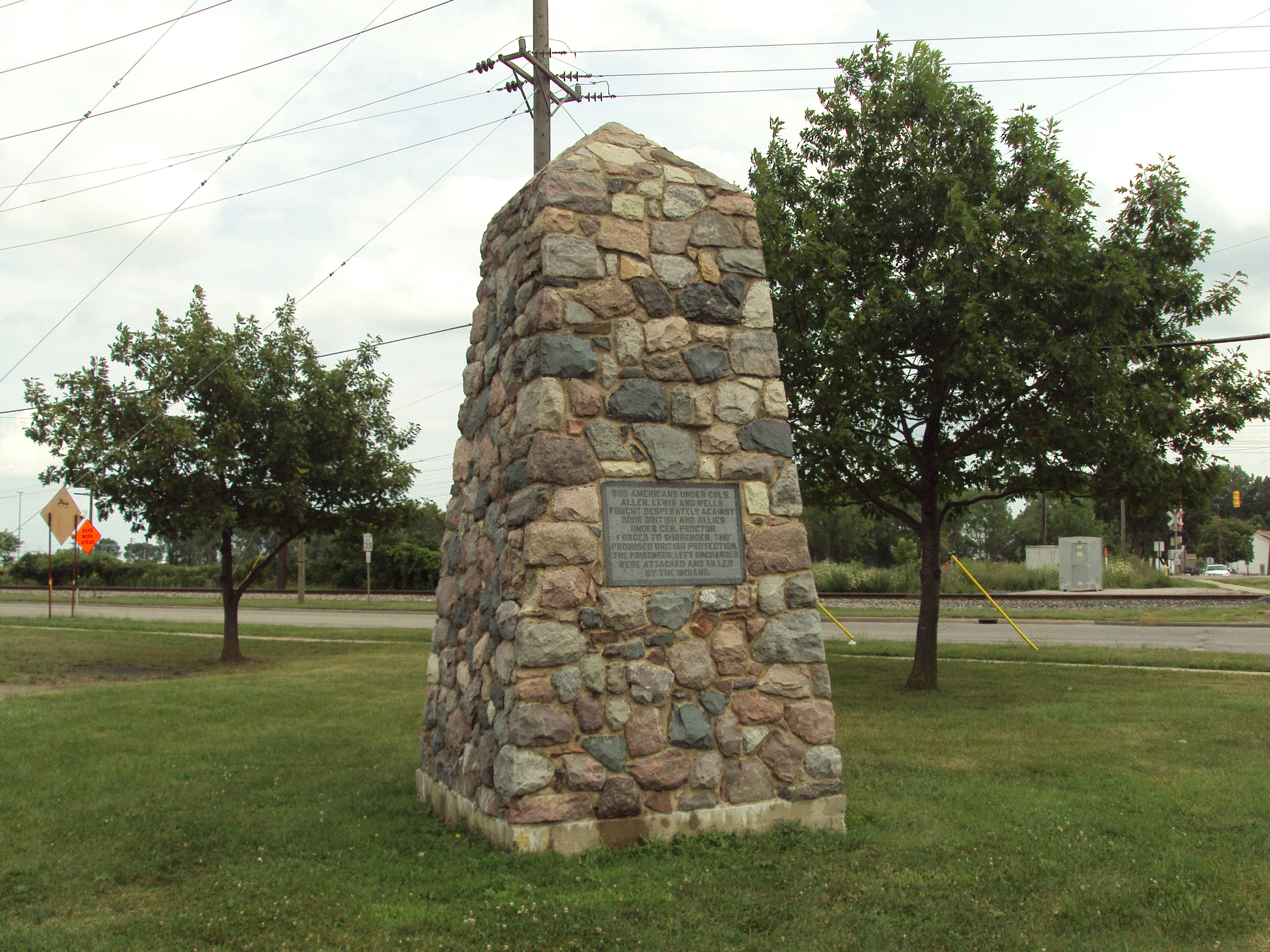
This obelisk, located in River Raisin National Battlefield Park, commemorates the victims of the battle and subsequent massacre.

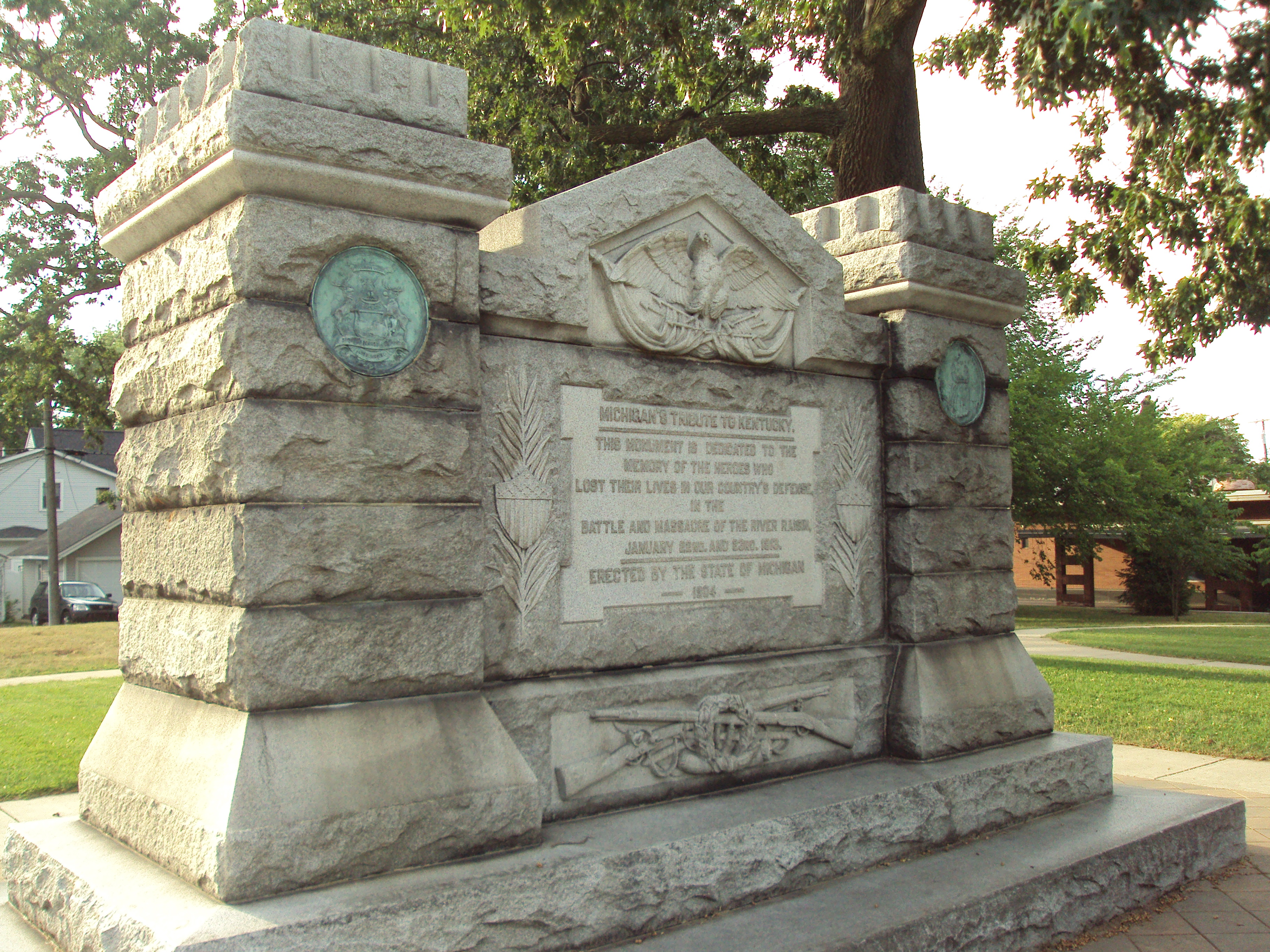
This monument south of the River Raisin commemorates the Kentuckians who died in the battle.
