= Gilbert Genesta =

American escapologist (1878–1930)

- Born: Royden Joseph Gilbert Raison DelaGenesta; March 29, 1878; Ashland, Kentucky, U.S.
- Died: November 9, 1930 (aged 52); Frankfort, Kentucky, U.S.
- Cause of death: Drowning
- Resting place: Frankfort Cemetery
- Occupations: Illusionist, magician, stunt performer, escape artist
- Years active: 1890-1930

Gilbert Genesta (born as Royden Joseph Gilbert Raison DelaGenesta; March 29, 1878 – November 9, 1930) was an American escape artist and magician who died from performing a water milk can escape.

== Early career ==
E. H. Weese allowed Genesta to perform on stage for Vaudette Theatre plays. Genesta began to operate the Genesta Theatre in Alma, Michigan. In March 1918, Genesta sold the Genesta Theatre to A. H. Ashley. Later on he would acquire Vaudette Theatre from E. H. Weese.

== Death ==
On November 8, 1930, Genesta was performing a trick in a vaudeville theater in Frankfort, Kentucky. He attempted to escape from a water-filled milk can in two minutes, a famous trick invented by Harry Houdini. However, prior to the performance his milk can had been dropped, damaging the secret escape hatch and rendering it inoperable . Genesta got out the can by three people breaking the milk can open got dragged out because he was unconscious . He proceeded to get revived by a physician and transported to the hospital. When he reached the hospital, the damage was too strong, causing him to die from drowning.
