= Paschal Hickman =

American military officer

Paschal Hickman (c. 1778 – January 23, 1813) was an American military officer who was killed in the River Raisin Massacre, an important event in the War of 1812. Hickman County, Kentucky is named for him.

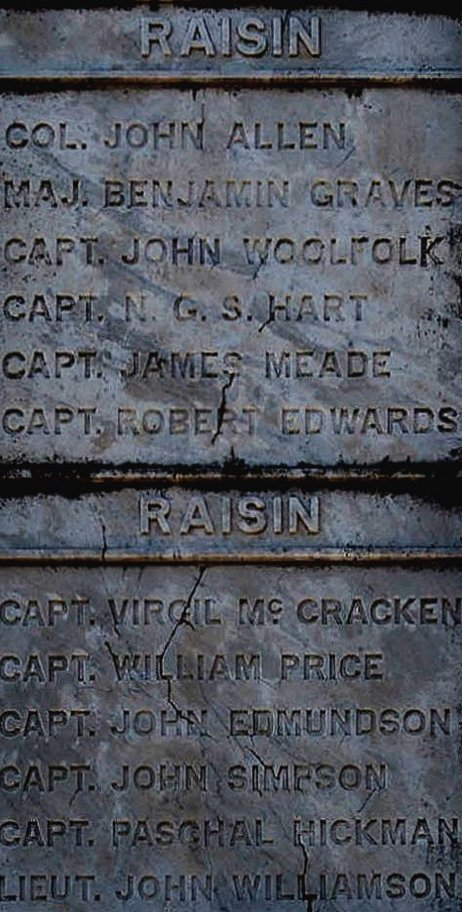
Hickman's name among the American dead of the River Raisin Massacre on the Kentucky War Monument, Frankfort, KY

Hickman was born in King and Queen County, Virginia, a son of famous Baptist preacher Reverend William Hickman and his wife Elizabeth Shackelford. William Hickman, a veteran of the Indian Wars as well as of the Revolutionary War, is said to have preached the first Christian sermon in Kentucky.

Paschal Hickman served as a private under Gen. Anthony Wayne at the Battle of Fallen Timbers in 1794. He was an ensign in the 22d Regiment of the Kentucky Militia in 1802, and a lieutenant in 1803. Hickman married Elizabeth Hall in 1797; he and his wife had three daughters and made their home in Frankfort. Hickman stood 6 feet 2 inches (1.88 m) tall and weighed 200 pounds. He was the jailer of Franklin County for some years.

In August 1812, shortly after the beginning of the War of 1812, Hickman raised a company for Colonel John Allen's 1st Kentucky Rifle Regiment and served as its captain. The regiment served in the campaign under Brigadier General James Winchester against British Colonel Henry Procter and the Wyandot leader Roundhead. Hickman was seriously wounded in the American victory at the First Battle of Frenchtown on January 18, 1813, and both of his legs had to be amputated. On January 22, the British and their Indigenous allies launched a counterattack. Winchester was defeated and captured along with over 500 of his men. Fearing that reinforcements under Major General William Henry Harrison were approaching, Procter retreated the same day, taking the uninjured prisoners with him and leaving the seriously wounded behind. The following morning, 100–200 Indigenous warriors returned and slaughtered some of the American wounded. The survivors were taken away but any who struggled to keep up with their captors were killed. Most were brought to Detroit and ransomed. Paschal Hickman was reportedly dragged from a house and tomahawked to death. It is thought that roughly 30 wounded prisoners were killed although some sources claim 60 or more.

Remember the Raisin became a rallying cry for American troops and the United States for the remainder of the war.

In 1822, Hickman County, Kentucky was formed and named in honor of Paschal Hickman. Eight other Kentucky counties are also named for officers who died in the battle or the following massacre.
