= Robert Eberhard Launitz =

American sculptor (1806–1870)

Robert Eberhard Launitz (4 November 1806 – 13 December 1870) was a Russian-American sculptor.

== Biography ==
Launitz was born into a Baltic German family in Riga, Governorate of Livonia, then part of the Russian Empire. He received a classical and military education in training for a military career. However, his interest in art intervened, and on the advice of an uncle, sculptor Eduard Schmidt von der Launitz, he went to Rome. There he trained under his uncle, and later under Thorwaldsen. He then settled in New York in 1828, deaf and with no knowledge of English. He found work as a journeyman under John Frazee. In 1831, he and Frazee became partners. Frazee left the partnership in 1837.

Launitz was the first instructor of Thomas Crawford. In 1833, he was made a member of the National Academy on the basis of his bas-relief "Venus and Cupid." He has been called the father of monumental art in America. He died in New York City. He is interred at Woodlawn Cemetery in the Bronx, New York City. Launitz was the maternal grandfather of Newark, New Jersey, Mayor Thomas L. Raymond.

== Work ==
He designed the commemorative stone for the State of New York that is installed on the interior walls of the Washington Monument (1853): "The block ordered by the Common Council of 1852, for the Washington Monument, is now finished by the designer, Robert E. Launitz. The block is of white marble, quarried at Lee, Mass., and is larger than any one that has yet been sent to Washington, being eight feet wide, and five feet six inches in height; the weight is about four tons. . . ."

He is responsible for the monument and statue in honor of Casimir Pulaski located in Savannah, Georgia. He executed many funerary monuments in Frankfort Cemetery, including the Kentucky War Memorial, which was unveiled in 1850. He created a monument to General George H. Thomas in Troy, New York; the Broken Mast Monument, which commemorates those "Who periled their lives in a daring profession and perished in actual encounter with the monsters of the deep," in Oakland Cemetery in Sag Harbor; and many other similar examples of his work are found in New York's Greenwood Cemetery. Two further examples of his work are found at Maple Hill Cemetery, Huntsville, Alabama — the tombstone of Dr. David Moore, and that of two of his children.

== Sources ==
- Smith, Benjamin A. (1894). The Century Cyclopedia of Names. New York: The Century Co. pp. 1085.
