= Leatherlips =

Wyandotte leader

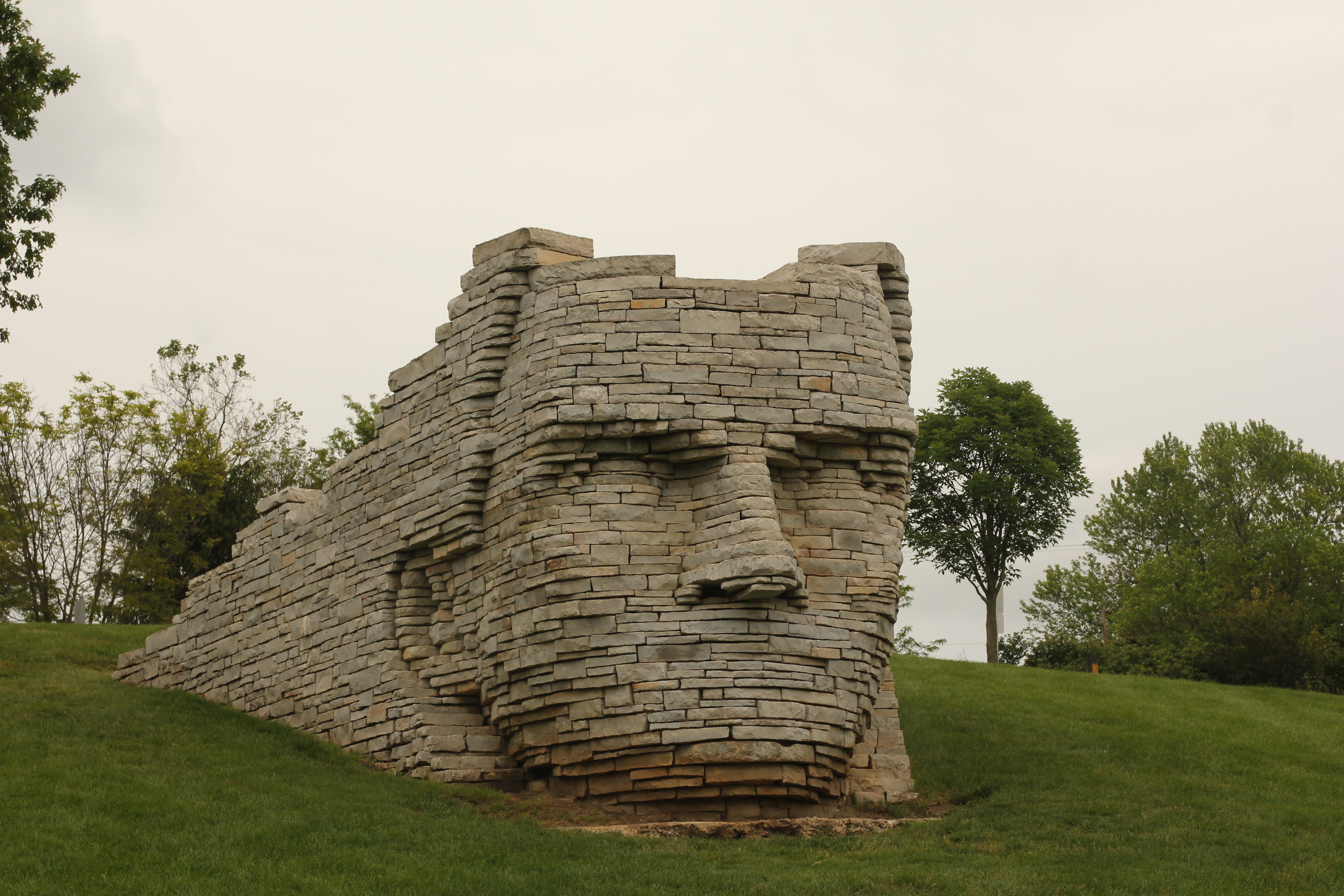
Leatherlips sculpture created by Ralph Helmick and installed at Scioto Park in Dublin, Ohio

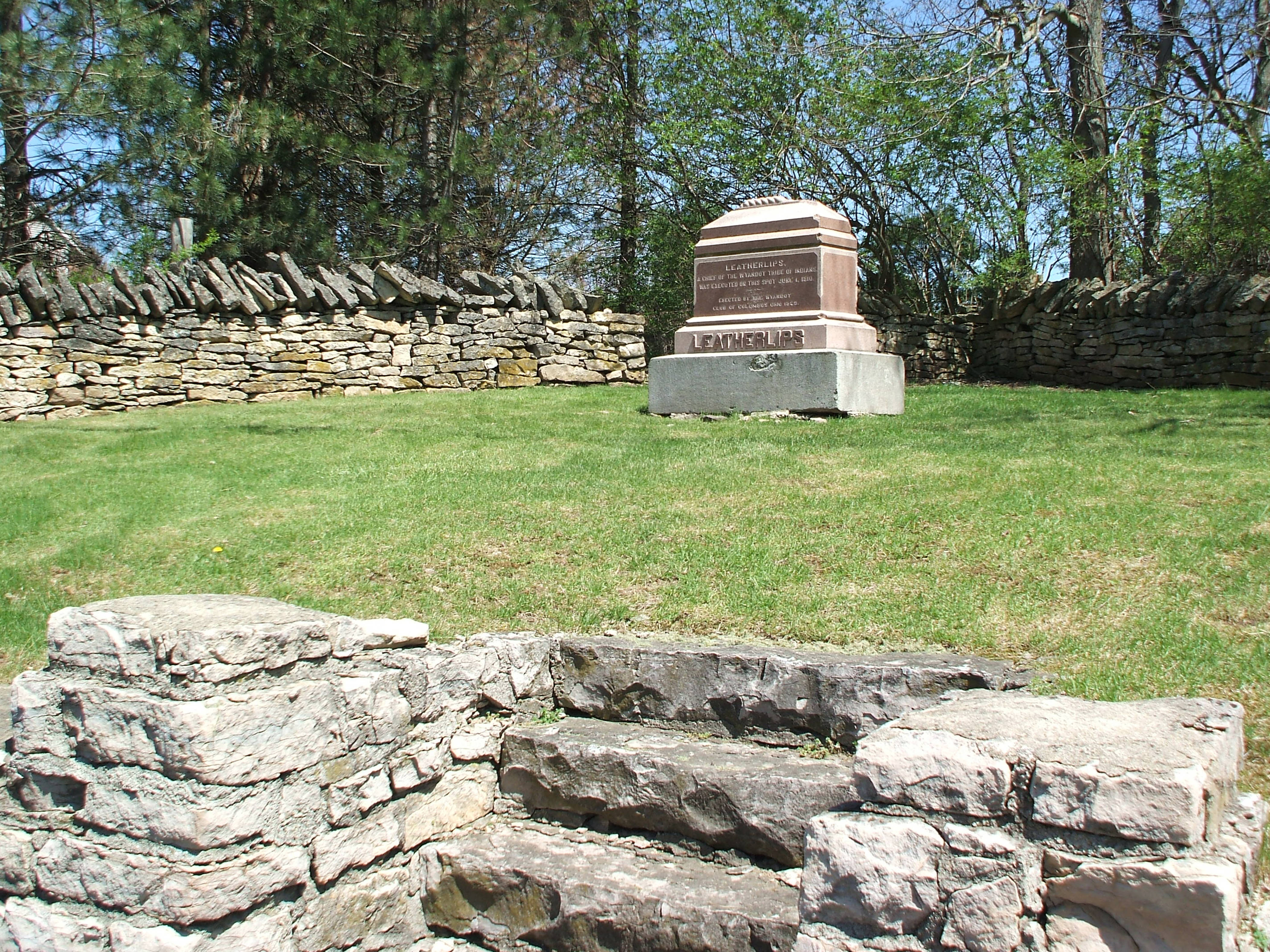
The Dublin, Ohio, cemetery where Leatherlips is buried.

Leatherlips (Wyandot: Sha‑Te‑Yah‑Ron‑Ya or Sou‑Cha‑Et‑Ess, c. 1732–1810) was a Wyandot leader of the late 18th and early 19th century.

Leatherlips had three Wyandot names. The one most often used was SHA‑TE‑YAH‑RON‑YA but he was sometimes referred to as THA‑TEY‑YAN‑A‑YOH. In later years he was called SOU‑CHA‑ET‑ESS, which means "Long Gray Hair". He was of the Porcupine Clan as was his great friend, Chief Tarhe, and he was related to Roundhead, Splitlog and Battise, noted Wyandot warriors of that period.

The Wyandots were heavily reduced in number by disease and a disastrous war with the Five Nations of the Haudenosaunee. Forced out of their homeland near Georgian Bay, they moved to the Ohio country. Leatherlips, an important leader, signed the Treaty of Greenville and encouraged cooperation with Euro-American settlers near the end of his life. That policy of accommodating Euro-Americans led to conflict with a movement led by two Shawnee brothers, Tecumseh and Tenskwatawa (The Prophet). Tenskwatawa reacted strongly against Leatherlips and condemned him to death for signing away native lands, and for witchcraft.

In 1810, Leatherlips' brother Roundhead, a fellow Wyandot chief, ordered his execution. Leatherlips was condemned to death by other natives for his desire to cooperate with Euro-American settlers. Not only was Leatherlips opposed to Tecumseh's Confederacy against the United States, but he had also sold native land to William Henry Harrison. However, it is widely believed that Leatherlips was executed for exaggerated charges of witchcraft to draw attention away from the true political motives. Roundhead took direct part in the execution of Leatherlips.

Dispatched by Roundhead, six Wyandots traveled to what is now Dublin, Ohio just north of Columbus and announced the death sentence. Although white settlers led by John Sells pleaded for the old chief and attempted to bribe the death squad, the trial and sentencing were swift. After clothing himself in his finest attire, Leatherlips, joined by his executioners, sang the death chant and prayed. Then he was killed by tomahawk.

A monument to Leatherlips and a memorial art sculpture are tourist stops in Dublin today.

The bribe was said to be tearing up the treaty in exchange for the chiefs life. (Source Needed)

== See also ==
- List of people executed for witchcraft
