= Kentucky War Memorial =

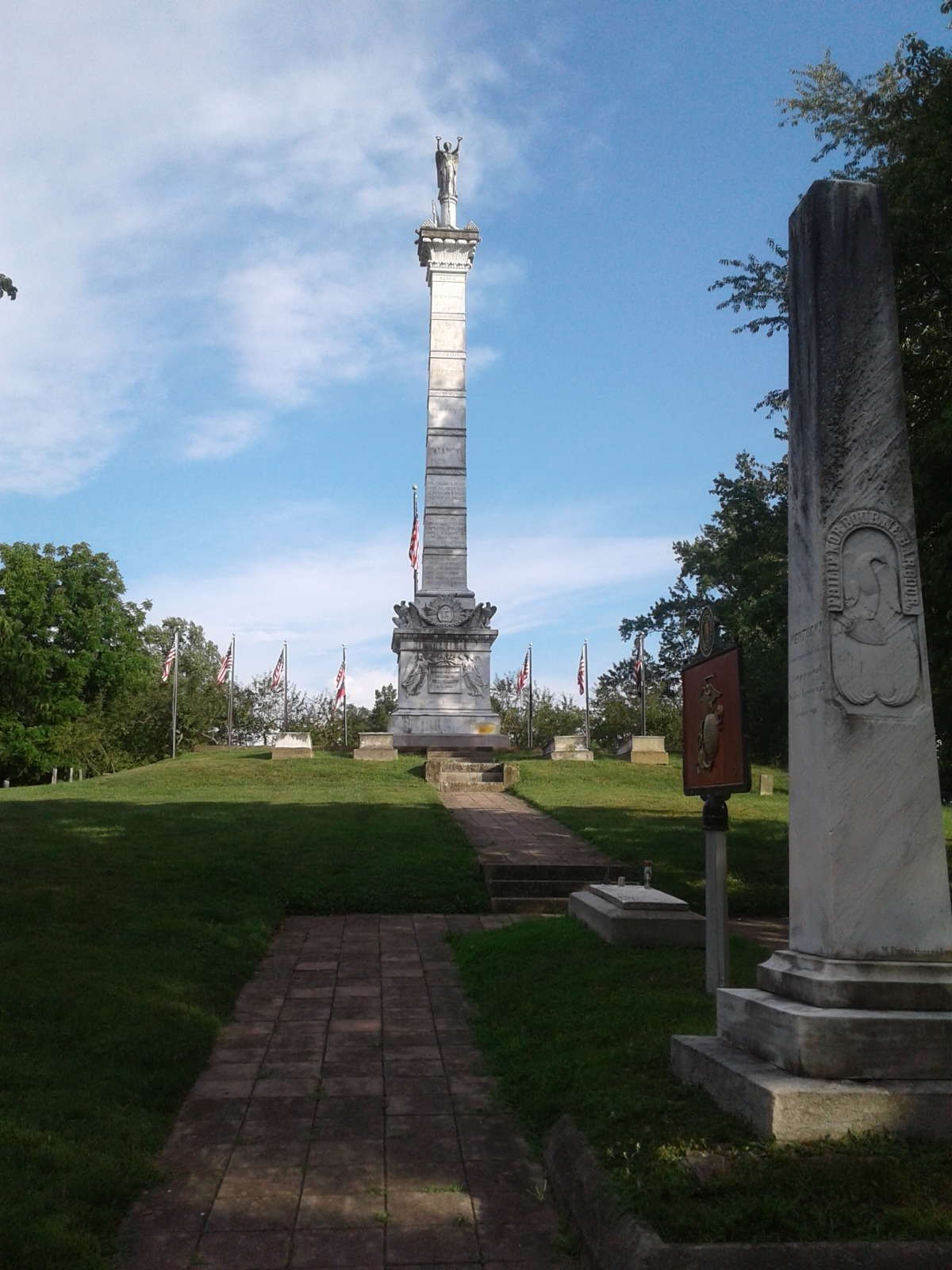

- Location within Kentucky
- 38°11′37″N 84°51′53″W
- Type: Military Memorial
- Location: Frankfort, Kentucky

History
- Built: 1850

Site notes
- Sculptor: Robert E. Launitz

The Kentucky War Memorial is a memorial to Kentuckians who have died in all wars. On a high-point called the "State Mound" in Frankfort Cemetery in Frankfort, Kentucky, the memorial consists of a 65-foot-tall monument erected in 1850, nine low stone monuments built in a semi-circle, and two low straight monuments. The 1850 monument honors men who died up until 1850 and it lists the battles and the officers who fell. The semi-circular area to the south of the tall monument lists the wars, and the straight monuments list the names of all of Kentucky's fallen. The wars mentioned include: War of Independence, War of 1812, the Texas War of Independence, the Mexican War, Civil War, Spanish–American War, World War I, World War II, Korean War, Vietnam War, and Persian Gulf War.

In 1848, an act passed by the state legislature appropriated $15,000 for its construction. The 65-foot-tall granite monument, topped by a statue of Victory, was unveiled in 1850.

The monument was erected to stand over the graves of 17 Kentucky soldiers who had fallen at the Battle of Buena Vista. Their interment in Frankfort Cemetery on July 20, 1847, was marked by a eulogy from John C. Breckinridge, a supporter of the war. According to a popular story, this mass funeral inspired Mexican-War veteran, Theordore O'Hara, to pen his famed poem, "Bivouac of the Dead". However, O'Hara was still with the army in Mexico in July 1848.

== Inscriptions ==
The 1850 monument is decorated on all four faces. Each face has a display on the base. The column is decorated with bands depicting battles, followed by names of officers who fell in those battles.

- South side: The south side of the monument features the coat of arms of Kentucky and the state motto, "United we stand; divided we fall." The base inscription says "Kentucky has erected this column in gratitude equally to her officers and soldiers." The south side of the column is inscribed with the names of those officers killed at St. Clair's defeat, Estill's Defeat, Tippecanoe, Fort Meigs, and Blue Licks.
- East side: The east side base is inscribed "By order of the legislature, the name of Col. J. J. Hardin of the 1st regt. Illinois Infantry, A son of Kentucky who fell at the Battle of Buena Vista is inscribed hereon." The east side of the column is inscribed with the names of three Kentucky naval officers who died in the performance of duty during the early 1870s: John Gunnell Talbot, Hugh McKee, and Alfred Foree.
- North side: The north side base is inscribed "Military Monument erected by Kentucky, A.D. 1850." The north side of the column is inscribed with the names of those officers killed at Boonesborough, Harmon's Defeat, Wayne's Campaign, Monterey, Buena Vista, Raisin, the River Raisin Massacre, and during the Mexican–American War.
- West side: The west side base inscription says "The principal battles and campaigns, in which her sons devoted their lives to their country are inscribed on the bands. And beneath the same are the names of her officers who fell. The names of her soldiers who died for their country are too numerous to be inscribed on any column." The west side of the column is inscribed with the names of those officers killed at Thames, at Little Bighorn, the Indian Wars, and Raisin

== Gallery ==
Photos of the Kentucky War Memorial in Frankfort Cemetery
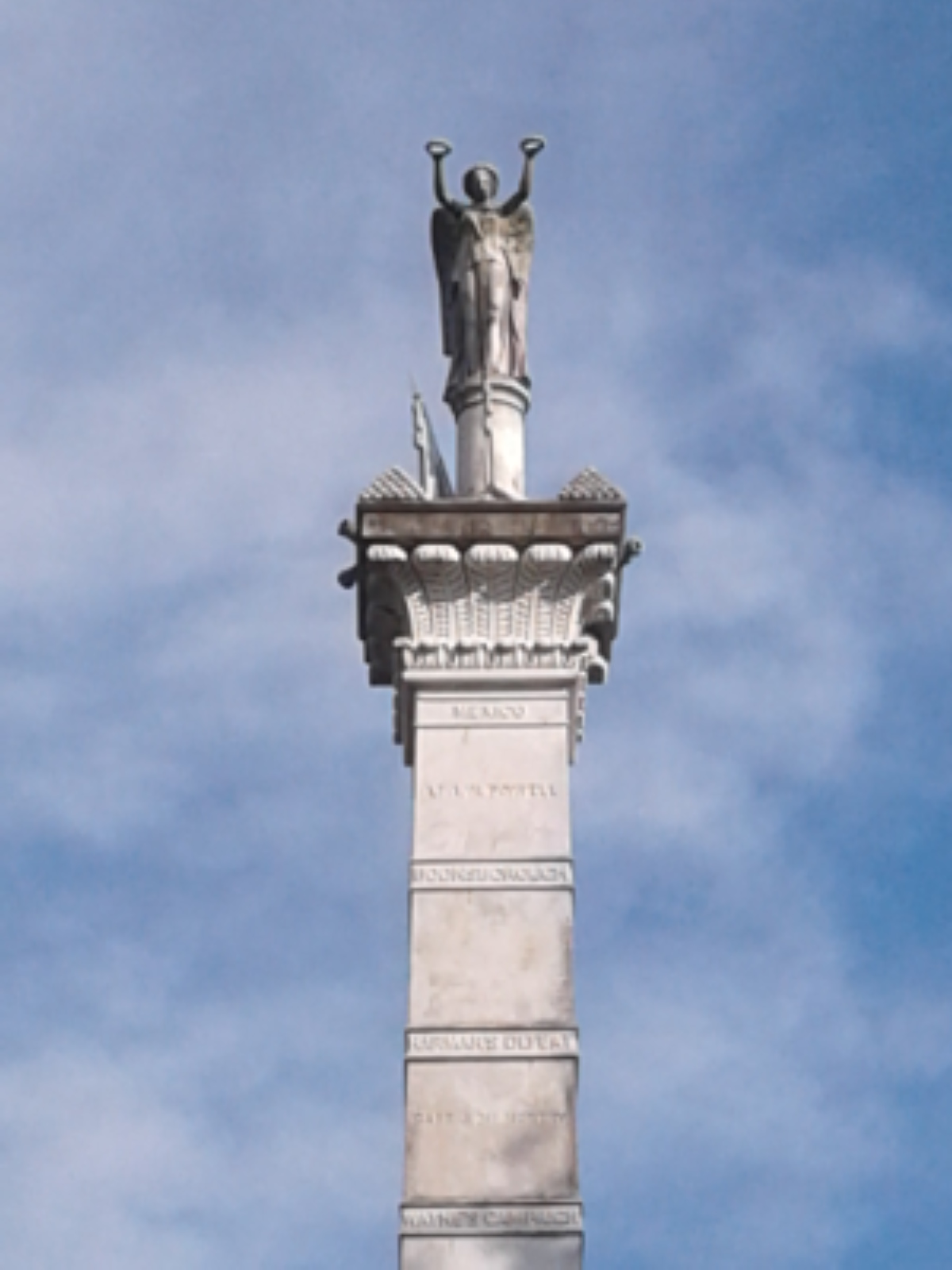
Victory statue atop the 1850 monument

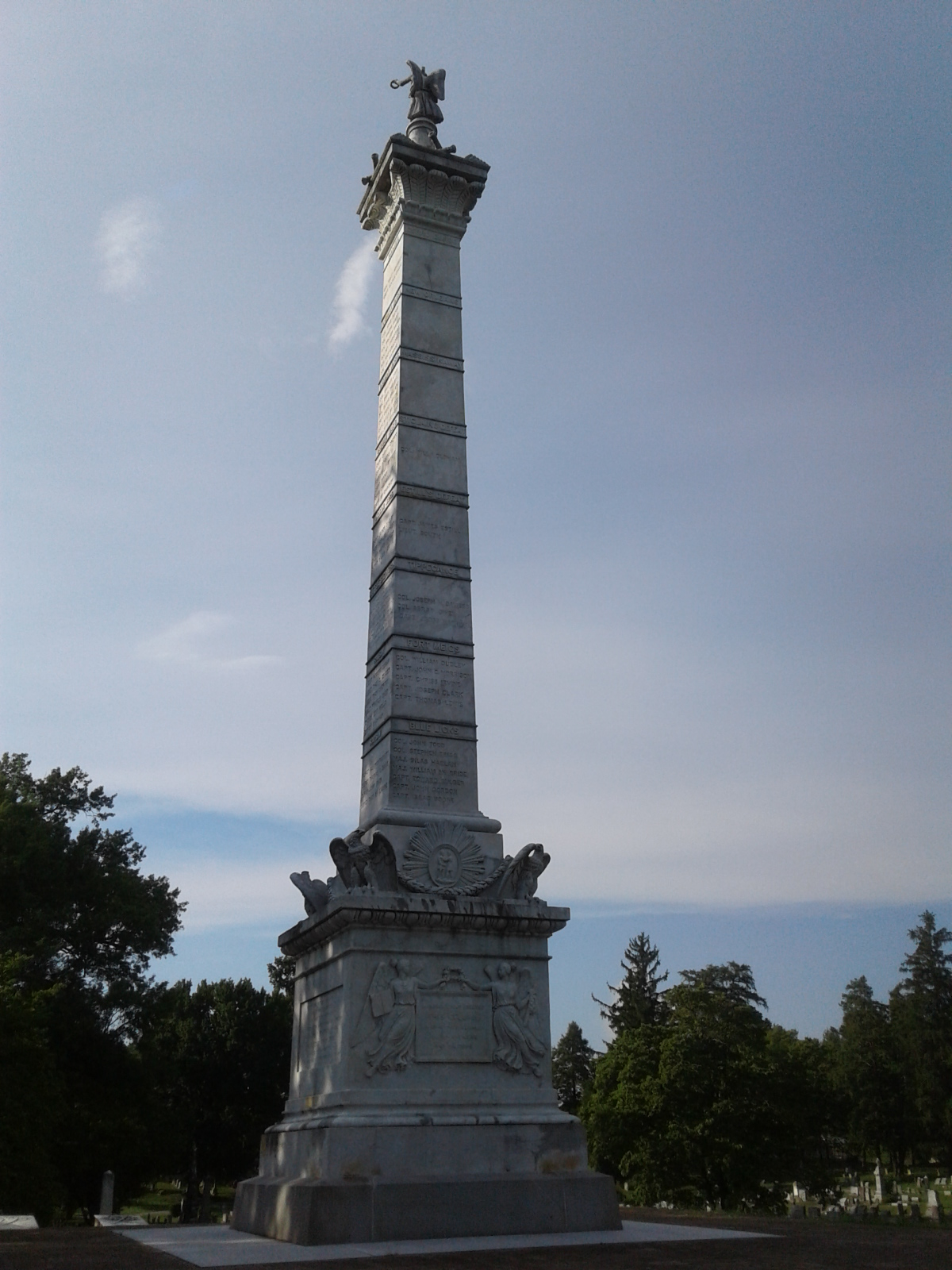
South view of 1850 monument

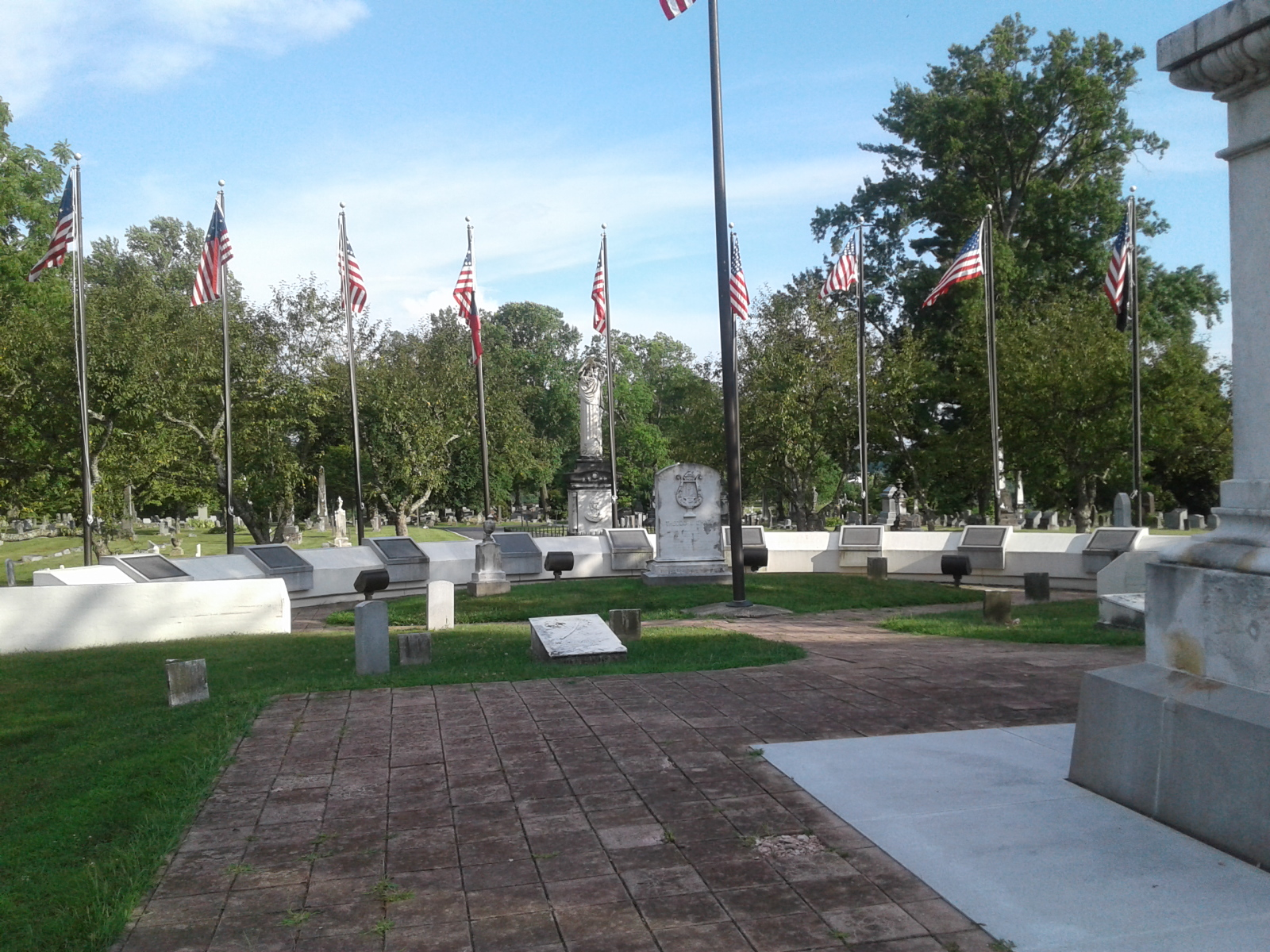
All wars memorial

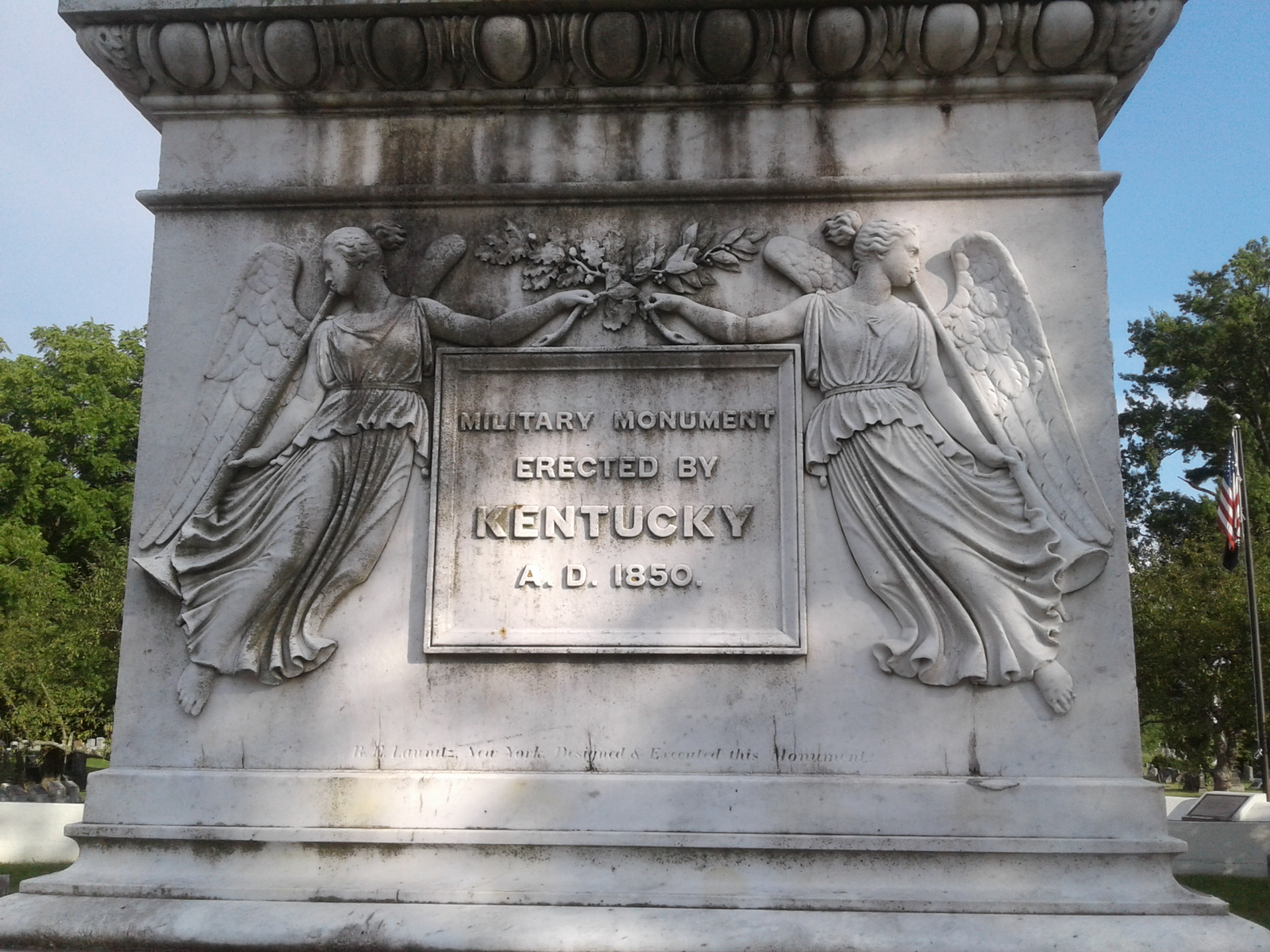
Inscription north face of 1850 monument

== See also ==
- Frankfort Cemetery
- Bivouac of the Dead
- American Revolutionary War
- Mexican–American War
- American Civil War
