= Walk-in-the-Water =

Walk-in-the-Water (or My-ee-rah) (died c. 1817) was a Wyandot chief.

== Biography ==
He was a member of the Wyandot tribe. At the beginning of the War of 1812, he offered his services to Gen. William Hull, but they were declined, owing to the unwillingness of that officer to employ "savages." He was afterward forced by circumstances to join the British at Malden, but he was instrumental in persuading several tribes to remain neutral, and in a council at that place he vindicated his course in a speech that was called by his enemies "American talk."

After this, Walk-in-the-Water and his associates openly broke with Tecumseh and The Prophet, and declined to remain with the British, deserting from Gen. Henry Proctor at Chatham, Canada. At the Battle of the Thames he offered his services, with those of sixty warriors, conditionally, to Gen. William Henry Harrison, who declined them, and the Wyandot returned to the Detroit River.

His totem was a turtle.
