= Roundhead (Wyandot) =

Chief of the Native American Wyandot tribe

- Born: c. 1760; Near the Sandusky River in New France (Ohio)
- Died: c. August 1813 (age 52–53); Upper Canada
- Other names: Bark Carrier, Stayeghtha, Stiahta
- Citizenship: Wyandot
- Known for: War of 1812
- Relatives: Jean-Baptiste, Leatherlips, Tharoutorea, Warrow

Roundhead (c. 1760 – 1813), also known as Bark Carrier, Round Head, Stayeghtha, and Stiahta, was a chief of the Wyandot people. He was a strong member of Tecumseh's confederacy against the United States during the War of 1812. He died of unknown natural causes about a month or two before Tecumseh was killed at the Battle of the Thames.

== Early life ==
Roundhead was born around 1760 near the Sandusky River in New France (the present-day state of Ohio). However, some sources indicate that he was born later in 1763. He rose to become chief of the Wyandot in the Sandusky area. He later moved to Brownstown and joined Tecumseh's anti-American cause.

Little is known about Roundhead's life prior to 1794, when he led the Wyandots at the Battle of Fallen Timbers (as a war chief under Tarhe), but this was during a time when various Wyandot clans feuded over their relations with the United States. Chief Roundhead participated in the Treaty of Greenville in 1795, arriving at the council from the vicinity of Detroit with a party of Wyandots, Shawnees, Six Nations, and Delawares at the end of July. Though the proceedings were almost over when Chief Roundhead arrived, he signed the agreement, by which the Native Americans gave up most of present-day Ohio and part of Indiana. In September 1800 he signed onto a treaty relinquishing to the British crown some 2,500 acres on the Canadian side of the Detroit River.

Not long after the Treaty of Greenville, Roundhead resigned his position as war chief under Tarhe and joined with Tecumseh against the Americans during the height of Tecumseh's War. In 1810, Roundhead was chiefly responsible for the execution of his brother and fellow Wyandot chief Leatherlips. He was condemned to death by other natives for his desire to cooperate with white settlers. Leatherlips opposed Tecumseh's Confederacy against the United States, and he had sold native land to William Henry Harrison. However, it is widely believed that Leatherlips was executed for exaggerated charges of witchcraft to draw attention away from the true political motives. While it is unknown if Roundhead took direct part in the execution of Leatherlips, he headed the council that called for his death. Roundhead dispatched fellow natives to capture him and carry out the execution.

== War of 1812 ==
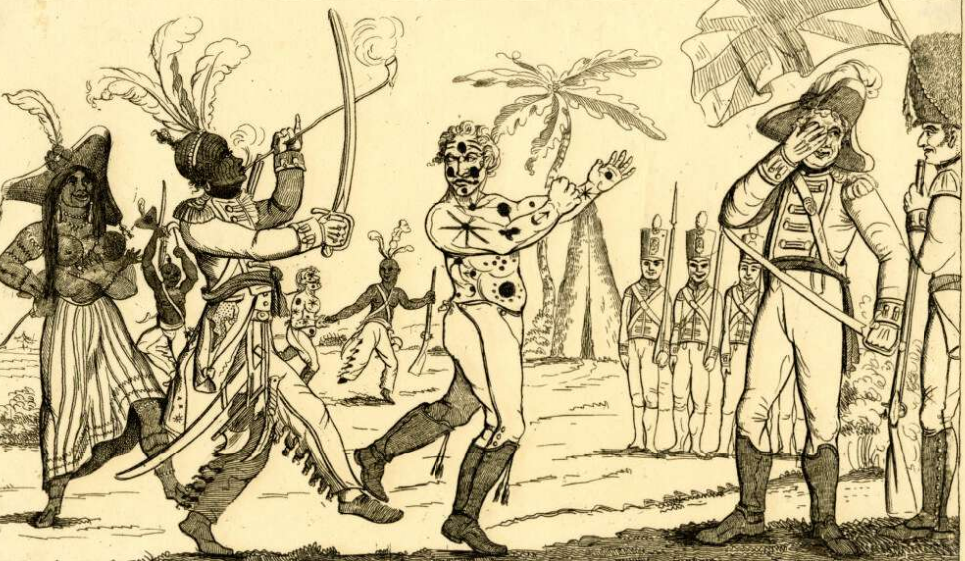
Satirical depiction of Wyandot Chief Roundhead's capture of American General James Winchester

During the War of 1812, Roundhead was second-in-command only to Tecumseh among Colonel Henry Procter's British forces. He participated in the Battle of Brownstown on August 5, 1812, and the Battle of Maguaga on August 9. After this battle, Tecumseh presented Roundhead with a sash given to him by General Isaac Brock, as Tecumseh claimed it should belong to an older and more skilled warrior. Roundhead did not wear the honorable sash, as he did not want to cause jealously among the other war chiefs. A few days later, he helped in the capture of Fort Detroit during the Siege of Detroit on August 15. He then joined up with Captain Adam Muir for the British occupation of Fort Miami along the Maumee River in September 1812. He later fought in the Siege of Fort Meigs from April 28–May 9, 1813. Another of Roundhead's brothers, Jean-Baptiste, died during this failed siege.

Roundhead's most notable accomplishment during the War of 1812 took place when he fought in the Second Battle of the River Raisin on January 22, 1813, overwhelmingly defeating the Americans. Tecumseh, who did not participate in the battle, gave command of the native forces to Roundhead, who was aided by fellow Wyandot chief Walk-in-the-Water. They commanded approximately 800 Native Americans along with Henry Procter's 597 British troops against a force of 1,000 Americans. The battle was a disastrous defeat for the Americans, as they were caught off guard in the early hours of the morning; it resulted in the most American casualties of any battle of the War of 1812. Shortly into the battle, Roundhead captured ill-prepared American general James Winchester and stripped him of his uniform, leading to the legend that Winchester was captured in his nightshirt. Having been captured, Winchester was unable to command his troops, and they suffered heavy losses. Roundhead presented Winchester to Procter, who forced the general to surrender his army after a few hours of fighting. Forty percent of his men had been killed; another 547 were taken prisoner at surrender. Following the battle, Roundhead aided in the quick retreat of Procter's troops back into Upper Canada. Months later, Tecumseh met American opposition there at the Battle of the Thames.

== Death ==
Roundhead died of natural causes shortly before the Battle of the Thames on October 5, 1813. On Roundhead's death, General Procter wrote in a letter dated October 23, 1813, "The Indian cause and ours experienced a serious loss in the death of Round Head." For years, Roundhead, who was a staunch supporter of Tecumseh, feuded with other Wyandot clans who supported Tarhe's pro-American stance. Once Tecumseh's forces were defeated at the Battle of the Thames, the division between the Wyandot ended. They began negotiations for peace with the Americans.

== Legacy and honors ==
In 1832, the site of his original Wyandot village was designated as the unincorporated community of Roundhead, Ohio. It is located within Roundhead Township in Hardin County, Ohio.
