= Caldwell's Western Rangers =

Caldwell’s Western Rangers
- Active: 1813-1815
- Disbanded: 1815
- Country: Upper Canada
- Allegiance: British Empire
- Branch: Upper Canadian Militia
- Type: Rangers
- Role: scouting skirmishing operations with Indigenous allies
- Size: Two companies
- Engagements: War of 1812: Siege of Fort Meigs; Battle of Fort Stephenson; Battle of the Thames; Battle of Longwoods; Battle of Chippawa; Battle of Lundy's Lane; Siege of Fort Erie

Commanders
- Notable commanders: Lieutenant Colonel William Caldwell

Caldwell’s Western Rangers, also commonly known as Caldwell’s Rangers and the Western Rangers, were a small British-allied ranger unit of the Upper Canadian Militia during the War of 1812. Raised in the Western District of Upper Canada, the rangers were associated with the prominent Loyalist, Indian Department officer, and trader William Caldwell and served alongside British regulars, local Canadian militia and Indigenous allies in the Detroit–Thames and Niagara campaigns.

The unit was formed in 1813 at the initiative of Colonel Henry Procter, the British commander on the Detroit frontier, who sought to recreate the mobile, bush-fighting ranger corps that had proved effective during the American Revolutionary War. The rangers were closely connected with the British Indian Department and Indigenous warriors, particularly Ojibwe, Wyandot, and Potawatomi fighters.

== Background ==
William Caldwell (c. 1750–1822) was an Irish-born Loyalist who had immigrated to North America in 1773. During the American Revolutionary War, he served as a captain in Butler's Rangers, a British provincial corps known for frontier scouting, raiding, and irregular warfare. After the war, Caldwell settled in the Detroit River region, became a merchant and landholder, and maintained close ties with Indigenous communities and British Indian Department officials.

When the War of 1812 began, Caldwell and several of his sons took up arms for Britain. In the autumn of 1812, Procter proposed establishing a ranger force modeled on Butler's Rangers. Early in 1813, he received authorization to create the corps, to be associated with William Caldwell.

== Organization and command ==
The Western Rangers were organized nominally as two companies, but they remained a small force. Contemporary and later accounts generally identify William Caldwell as the unit's commander, but some evidence indicates that his son, Captain William Caldwell, actually led the Rangers in the field. William Caldwell's sons Thomas and Francis also served as officers.

The Rangers were recruited largely from Essex County, near Amherstburg and the Detroit frontier. Unlike members of the sedentary militia, they appear to have been committed to continuous British service rather than being free to leave at will.

== Operations in 1813 ==
During the summer of 1813, the Western Rangers took part in a series of actions south of Lake Erie, operating in the contested Detroit frontier region. Their duties likely included scouting, screening British movements, skirmishing, and cooperating with Indigenous forces; this matched the traditional role of previous North American ranger units.

Francis Xavier Caldwell, William Caldwell's son, later recorded that he joined the Western Rangers as a lieutenant when the corps was formed that summer. The unit was present at the Battle of Fort Stephenson in August 1813 and participated in the British withdrawal from Amherstburg later that year.

In October 1813, Major General Henry Procter abandoned Detroit and Amherstburg and retreated eastward along the Thames River. The Western Rangers accompanied the retreating British force. At the Battle of the Thames—also called the Battle of Moraviantown—Procter's force was defeated by an American army under Major General William Henry Harrison. British regulars were quickly overrun or surrendered, but Caldwell and the Rangers took position beside their Indigenous allies and continued fighting after the regular line had collapsed.

Although the battle was a decisive American victory and resulted in the death of the Shawnee leader Tecumseh, Caldwell and his sons escaped death or capture. The survival of the Caldwell family and at least part of the Ranger force allowed the unit to continue serving in 1814.

== Service in 1814 ==
In March 1814, the Western Rangers fought at the Battle of Longwoods, near present-day Thamesville, Ontario. The engagement was an unsuccessful British attempt to dislodge an American raiding party; Caldwell and his sons again served as rangers during the action.

In May 1814, William Caldwell replaced Matthew Elliott as superintendent of Indian affairs for the Western District. He used his influence to place his sons William and Thomas in the Indian Department, while Francis Xavier Caldwell remained with the Rangers.

Later in 1814, members of the Caldwell family and the Western Rangers served in the Niagara campaign. They fought at the Battle of Chippawa, the Battle of Lundy's Lane, and the Siege of Fort Erie. These engagements placed the Rangers far from their original Detroit River recruiting area and showed that they were employed as a mobile auxiliary force rather than as a fixed garrison unit.

== Disbandment ==
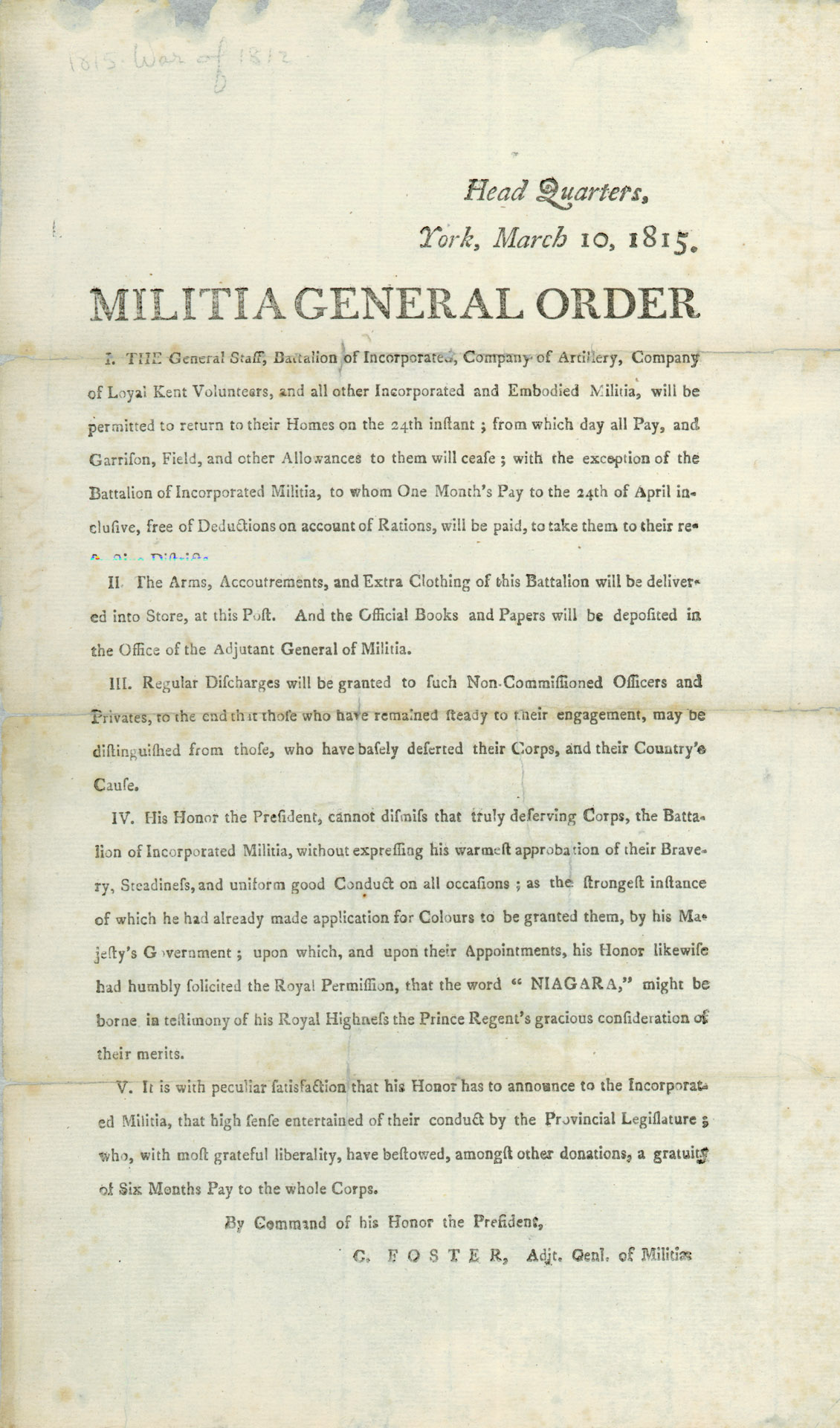
A militia general order issued from York demobilizing the full-time militia in Upper Canada after the end of the war, in March 1815

Following the signing of the Treaty of Ghent and the coming of peace in early-1815, the Western Rangers were stood down and disbanded in March 1815 along with the other “full-time” militia units such as the Incorporated Militia Battalion and the Provincial Light Dragoons.

== Uniform and equipment ==
Limited reliable documentation survives concerning the Rangers' clothing and equipment. Available accounts indicate that they were issued a "bucket cap"—probably a cut-down infantry shako without its brass plate or plume—grey woollen trousers, a green woollen tunic, and a black leather bayonet belt and cartridge box. In summer, white cotton trousers may have replaced the woollen ones.

The exact firearm issued to the unit is uncertain. Some historians have suggested captured American Springfield Model 1795 muskets, which British forces had seized in quantity at Detroit, while others argue that trade muskets may have been used. The Rangers reportedly found the standard infantry bayonet cumbersome in wooded terrain and often used hatchets or tomahawks instead.

== Perpetuation ==
Within the Canadian Army, Caldwell’s Western Rangers are perpetuated by the Essex and Kent Scottish Regiment; and the regiment bears the War of 1812 battle honours won by the Caldwell’s Rangers:

- Defence of Canada – 1812–1815 – Défense du Canada
- Maumee
- Niagara

== Notable members ==
- Lieutenant Colonel William Caldwell
- Captain Francis Xavier Caldwell

== Modern re-enactment unit(s) ==
Fort Malden National Historic Site in Amherstburg, Ontario has in recent years employed summer students for the re-created unit at the park and regional re-enactments.

== See also ==
- Canadian units of the War of 1812
