= William Caldwell (ranger) =

Irish-born Loyalist army officer and colonial official (c. 1750 – 1822)

- Born: c. 1750; County Fermanagh, Ireland
- Died: 20 February 1822; Amherstburg, Upper Canada
- Spouse: Suzanne Baby
- Children: Billy Caldwell; Francis Xavier Caldwell
- Military career
- Units: Butler's Rangers; Caldwell's Rangers
- Conflicts: Lord Dunmore's War; American Revolutionary War; Northwest Indian War; War of 1812

William Caldwell (c. 1750 – 20 February 1822) was an Irish-born Loyalist military officer and a colonial official in the British Indian Department. He fought against the Patriots during the American Revolutionary War, serving with Butler's Rangers based at Fort Niagara and Fort Detroit. After the war, together with other Loyalists, Caldwell was granted land in Upper Canada (now Ontario). He became a farmer and merchant, and is credited with the founding of the New Settlement east of the mouth of the Detroit River. During the War of 1812 he was authorized to recruit a unit of mounted volunteers known as Caldwell's Rangers that saw action at the Battle of the Thames. Caldwell briefly served as Deputy Superintendent of Indians for the Western District beginning in 1814.

== Early life ==
Caldwell is thought to be the son of William Caldwell and his wife Rebekka of County Fermanagh, Ireland. He emigrated to Virginia in 1773, and in 1774, served as an officer under John Murray, 4th Earl of Dunmore during Lord Dunmore's War.

== Revolutionary War ==
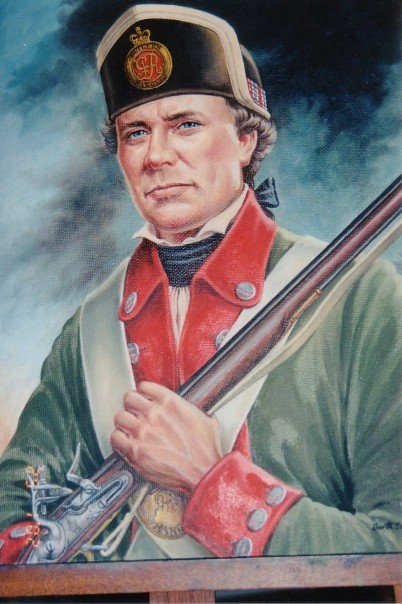
A portrait by Garth Dittrick of a member of Butler's Rangers.

Following the outbreak of the American Revolutionary War, Caldwell again served under Dunmore at the Burning of Norfolk in January 1776. He was injured during this engagement and evacuated to New York. After recovering from his wounds, Caldwell went to Fort Niagara, where he joined the British Indian Department. He was present at the Siege of Fort Stanwix in August 1777. Caldwell transferred to Butler's Rangers upon its formation later that year. He was commissioned a captain on 24 December 1777 and given command of a company.

In a letter dated 19 July 1781, the commander of Fort Niagara, Brigadier Henry Watson Powell, described Caldwell as "a very active Partisan." Caldwell was in the field for most of the war and spent very little time at Fort Niagara except when ill or wounded.

On 3 July 1778, Caldwell led his company at the Battle of Wyoming. Under the command of Major John Butler, the Rangers and their Iroquois allies routed the Patriot militia who had marched out to attack them. The battle is often referred to as the "Wyoming Massacre" because of the roughly 300 Patriot casualties, many of whom were killed by the Iroquois as they fled the battlefield or after they had been taken prisoner. Widespread looting and burning of buildings occurred throughout the Wyoming Valley in the days following the battle, but non-combatants were not harmed.

A week later, Butler sent Caldwell to Onaquaga on the Susquehanna River to support Mohawk leader Joseph Brant and recruit for the Rangers. During this time two of Caldwell's men deserted. In accordance with Butler's standing orders, Caldwell dispatched Lieutenant John Turney to track down and execute the deserters. In his journal, Richard McGinnis reported that Turney had the two men shot and scalped. According to McGinnis the scalps were later hung up in Caldwell's tent.

In September 1778, Caldwell was with Brant during the attack on German Flatts in the Mohawk River valley. The settlers received timely warning of the attack, and took refuge inside Fort Herkimer and Fort Dayton. Brant and Caldwell destroyed 63 homes in the vicinity, a similar number of barns, three grist mills, and one saw mill. They drove off a large number of horses, cattle, and sheep, killing those they could not take with them. More than 700 people were made homeless. Because they had been forewarned only three settlers were killed. Caldwell wrote that the attack, "would have in all probability killed most of the inhabitants of German Flatts had they not been apprised of our coming by one of the scouts getting in and warning of our approach."

In November 1778, Caldwell was with the expedition commanded by Captain Walter Butler that raided Cherry Valley. Although the settlement was defended by a fort garrisoned by the 7th Massachusetts Regiment, many of the officers were billeted in homes some distance away, including their commanding officer. Butler deployed the two companies of Rangers and a detachment of British regulars against the fort but failed to restrain his Seneca allies who rampaged through the settlement. 14 soldiers and 30 non-combatants including women and children were massacred and another 70 taken prisoner.

As a result of the British defeat at the Siege of Fort Vincennes, Caldwell and his company were posted to Fort Detroit in April 1779. They were recalled to Fort Niagara four months later to help repel the Sullivan Expedition against the Iroquois but did not arrive until after the Americans had begun their withdrawal from Seneca and Cayuga territory. Caldwell was tasked with shadowing the American army to ensure that no attempt was made to attack Fort Niagara.

In October 1780, Caldwell was part of the large-scale raid against the Schoharie and Mohawk River valleys of New York that culminated in the inconclusive Battle of Klock's Field. In August 1781, he led the raid that burned mills, storehouses and barns at Wawarsing and Napanoch in Ulster County, New York. In his report to Powell, Caldwell wrote, "I had the good fortune not to have a Ranger killed or wounded during our operations in those settlements." He ended his report with, "It is almost impossible to describe the situation of the party at present, worn out with hunger and fatigue."

Caldwell was posted to Detroit in October 1781 and remained there for the remainder of the war. In June 1782, he led his company and Indigenous allies during the opening stages of the Battle of Upper Sandusky. Caldwell was wounded in both legs early in the engagement and turned over command to Matthew Elliot, a British Indian Department officer. Two months later, Caldwell and 300 Indigenous warriors briefly besieged Bryan Station then routed the Kentucky militia at the Battle of Blue Licks.

== Postwar ==
When the war ended, Caldwell settled on the east side of the Detroit River opposite Bois Blanc Island. He later secured grants totalling 2000 acres in the vicinity of what is now Amherstburg. In 1784, Caldwell obtained from the Ojibwe a parcel of land on the north shore of Lake Erie, which he called the New Settlement, and encouraged former members of Butler's Rangers to settle there. Three years later he turned over ownership and responsibility for the New Settlement to the commander of Fort Detroit.

For a few years after the war Caldwell operated as a merchant in partnership with Elliott but the business struggled due to unpaid debts. He was appointed a magistrate for the Western District in 1788.

During the Northwest Indian War, Caldwell led a group of volunteers from Detroit in support of the Northwestern Confederacy. Caldwell's volunteers fought a rearguard action when the Legion of the United States led by "Mad Anthony" Wayne routed Confederacy warriors at the Battle of Fallen Timbers in August 1794.

== War of 1812 ==
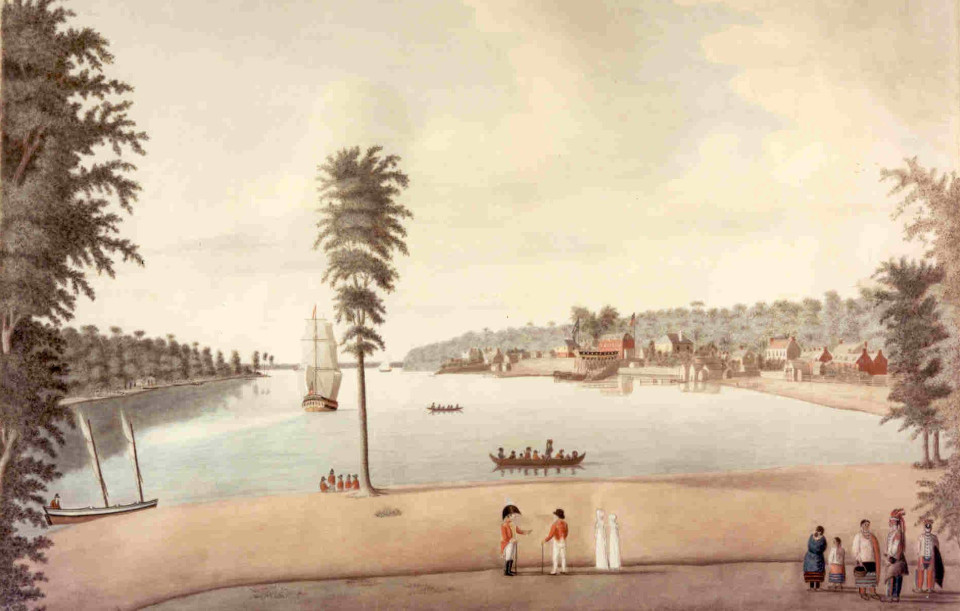
View of Amherstburg, 1812. Watercolour by Catherine Reynolds (1784-1864)

Although Caldwell had held the rank of Lieutenant Colonel in the Essex Militia before the War of 1812, he initially served as Assistant Quartermaster General for the Western District. After the surrender of Detroit in August 1812, he was appointed a member of a court of inquiry investigating desertions and defections that had occurred prior to the arrival of Major General Isaac Brock.

At the urging of Indigenous leaders, the military commander of the Western District, Colonel Henry Procter, proposed the creation of a unit similar to Butler's Rangers. Caldwell went to Montreal to lobby Governor General George Prevost on the idea. Provost authorized a unit of 60 men to be raised in the Western District. Most sources state that Caldwell led the Western Rangers, however, there is evidence that it was his son, Captain William Caldwell, who commanded the unit. Two other sons, Thomas and Francis, served as Lieutenants. Caldwell's Rangers, as they came to be known, participated in a number of minor engagements in the summer of 1813 before retreating with British forces when Procter abandoned Detroit and Amherstburg in October 1813. Caldwell and his sons were with Procter when he was defeated by William Henry Harrison at the Battle of the Thames in October 1813 but escaped capture.

Caldwell's house, barn, stables and orchards were destroyed by American troops after Procter had withdrawn from Amherstberg. Following the war, Caldwell claimed £2803 in damages but was awarded less than half that amount.

In May 1814, Caldwell succeeded Elliot as Deputy Superintendent of Indians in the Western District. Conflict with the British commander at Amherstburg, however, resulted in Caldwell's dismissal from the Indian Department in October 1815.

== Marriage and family ==
In 1783, Caldwell married Suzanne Baby, daughter of Jacques Baby dit Dupéront and Susanne Réaume dit La Croix. Together they had eight children: five sons and three daughters. William, Thomas and Francis served in the Essex Militia and Caldwell's Rangers during the War of 1812 and saw action at the Battle of Frenchtown, the Siege of Fort Meigs, the Battle of the Thames, and the Battle of Longwoods. Francis later became a businessman and political figure in Upper Canada.

While based at Fort Niagara during the Revolutionary War, Caldwell had a relationship with a Mohawk woman whose name is unknown but was the daughter of a minor Mohawk chief Rising Sun. Their son Billy was born c. 1780 in the vicinity of Fort Niagara where many of the Mohawk had taken refuge. The boy spent his childhood with the Mohawks near Niagara and later on the Grand River where many of the Mohawk settled after the war. In 1789, Caldwell brought Billy into his family and arranged for his formal education. Billy served as a captain in the British Indian Department during the War of 1812 and was severely wounded at the Battle of Frenchtown while attempting to rescue an injured American officer. He later acted as an intermediary during negotiations with the Potawatomis, Odawa, and Ojibwe that led in 1833 to the cession of their lands in Illinois and Wisconsin and their removal west of the Mississippi River.

William Caldwell died on 20 February 1822 in Amherstburg, Upper Canada.
