= Francis Xavier Caldwell =

Colonial Canadian politician

Francis Xavier Caldwell (May 4, 1792 – June 5, 1851) was a businessman and political figure in Upper Canada.

== Early life ==
Caldwell was born in Detroit in 1792, the son of William Caldwell and Suzanne Bâby. His father, a Loyalist, had served during the war as a captain in Butler's Rangers, a British provincial regiment. His mother was the daughter of French fur-trader Jacques Bâby dit Dupéron. Although Caldwell was born in Detroit, his family lived across the Detroit River in Upper Canada near what became Amherstburg. Detroit had unofficially remained a British possession after the American Revolutionary War, but was transferred to American control in 1796.

== Military career ==
During the War of 1812, Caldwell and his brothers Thomas and William served in the 1st Essex Militia and later in Caldwell's Rangers. As an ensign in the 1st Essex, Caldwell took part in the Siege of Detroit in August 1812, the Battle of Frenchtown in January 1813, and the Siege of Fort Meigs in May 1813. He joined the Western Rangers as a Lieutenant upon its formation that summer. It is usually claimed that the Western Rangers, also known as Caldwell's Rangers, were commanded by Caldwell's father. There is evidence, however, that it was Caldwell's brother, Captain William Caldwell, who led the unit. The Western Rangers were present at the Battle of Fort Stephenson in August 1813 and participated in the withdrawal of British forces led by Major General Henry Procter from Amherstburg. They escaped capture when Procter was defeated by Major General William Henry Harrison at the Battle of the Thames in October 1813.

In March 1814, the Western Rangers saw action during an unsuccessful attempt by British forces to dislodge an American raiding party at the Battle of Longwoods. Caldwell again saw action at the Battle of Lundy's Lane in July 1814.

After the war, Caldwell returned to the family farm and began rebuilding. His father's house, barn, stables and orchards had been destroyed by American troops after Procter had withdrawn from Amhertsberg. His father claimed £2803 in damages but was awarded less than half that amount. Caldwell rejoined the Essex militia as a captain but in 1823 tendered his resignation, along with three other officers, in a dispute over seniority. His resignation was not accepted and he was reprimanded for making false statements.

== Political career ==
Caldwell was appointed customs collector for Amherstburg in 1831. In October of that year he married Marie Françiose Bâby née Réaume, a widow with two children. Their only child, William was born a year later. In 1833, Caldwell was appointed a magistrate and the following year he was elected to the Legislative Assembly of Upper Canada for Essex. Caldwell was re-elected in 1836. His wife Françiose died in 1837. Caldwell was defeated in the election of 1841 by John Prince.

== Business interests ==
In 1835, Caldwell invested heavily in village lots near the Colborne Iron Works (also known as the Colborne Furnace) in Gosfield Township, Essex County. The iron works soon ran into financial difficulty due to cheaper American iron and uncertainty related to the Upper Canada Rebellion. Francis had to assume financial responsibility for some of the debt accrued to Benjamin Parker Cahoon, one of the iron works' founders who had fled to the United States. He was subsequently forced to mortgaged all of his properties to cover these and other debts.

== Death ==
Francis Xavier Caldwell died in Malden Township on 5 Jun 1851.
