= Battle of Fort Stephenson =

War of 1812 battle

- Part of the War of 1812 and Tecumseh's War
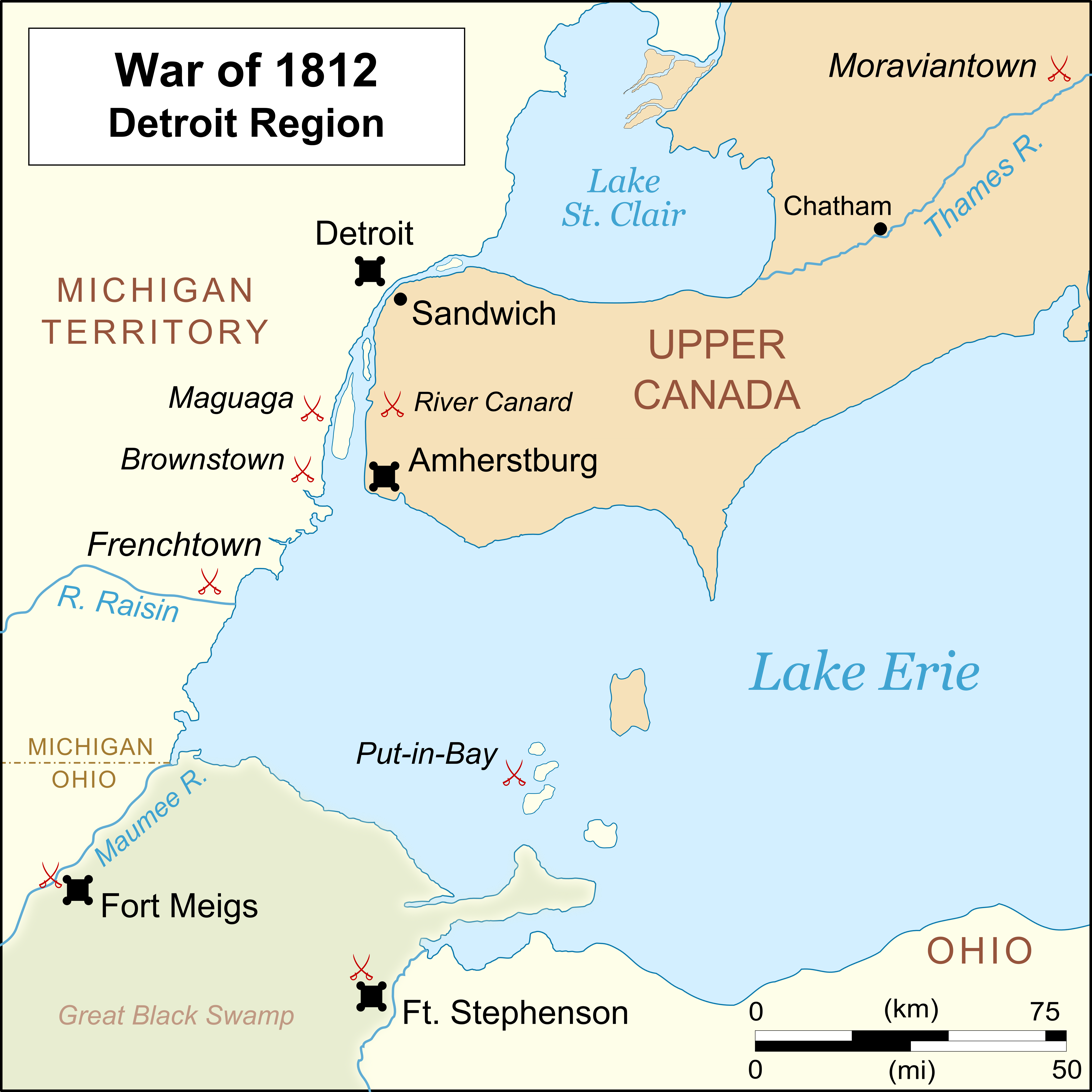
Date	August 1–2, 1813
Location	Sandusky County, Ohio 41°20′46″N 83°6′55″W
Result	American victory

Belligerents
United Kingdom; Tecumseh's confederacy	United States

Commanders and leaders
(United Kingdom of Great Britain and Ireland) Henry Procter; Robert Dickson; Matthew Elliott	(United States) George Croghan

Strength
506 regulars 200–800 Indigenous warriors	167 U.S. regulars

Casualties and losses
26 killed 41 wounded 29 missing	1 killed 7 wounded

The Battle of Fort Stephenson was a decisive American victory in Ohio during the War of 1812. American forces led by Major George Croghan successfully defended the fort during a two-day siege by British and Indigenous forces in August 1813.

== Background ==
In the early summer of 1812, shortly after the United States declared war on the United Kingdom, a stockade and blockhouse were constructed on the west side of the Sandusky River about 10 miles (16 km) upstream from Sandusky Bay in what is now Fremont, Ohio. The fortification, initially known as Fort Sandusky, was burned to the ground a few month's later by Britain's Indigenous allies. In March 1813, the fort was rebuilt under the supervision of Captain Eleazar Wood of the Army Corps of Engineers. The stockade was expanded, two additional blockhouses were built, and the fort was given a new name. Fort Stephenson was one of several forts that Major General William Henry Harrison, ordered constructed in northwestern Ohio as supply depots and staging areas for the Army of the Northwest.

After failing to capture Fort Meigs on the Maumee River following an 11-day siege in May 1813, the British commander at Amherstburg, Major General Henry Procter, decided to target Fort Stephenson. His Indigenous allies, however, led by Tecumseh, insisted on a second attack on Fort Meigs. On 21 July, Tecumseh's warriors staged a mock battle in the woods to make it appear as if they were attacking a relief column in order to lure the Americans out of the fort. The ruse failed since the fort's commanding officer knew that no reinforcements were coming. Procter abandoned the siege, then proceeded east to Fort Stephenson.

Fort Stephenson, commanded by Major George Croghan, was garrisoned by seven officers and 160 men, most of whom were from the 17th Infantry. They were supported by a single six-pounder gun dubbed "Old Betsy." Harrison, who had established his headquarters nine miles (14 km) upriver at Fort Seneca, believed Procter's force to be much larger than it was, and on July 29, instructed Croghan to destroy the fort and withdraw. In response Croghan wrote, "We have determined to defend this place and by heavens we can." Harrison relieved Croghan of his command and ordered him to report to headquarters. Croghan met with Harrison, explained his apparent insubordination, and returned to Fort Stephenson as its commander on July 31.

== Battle ==
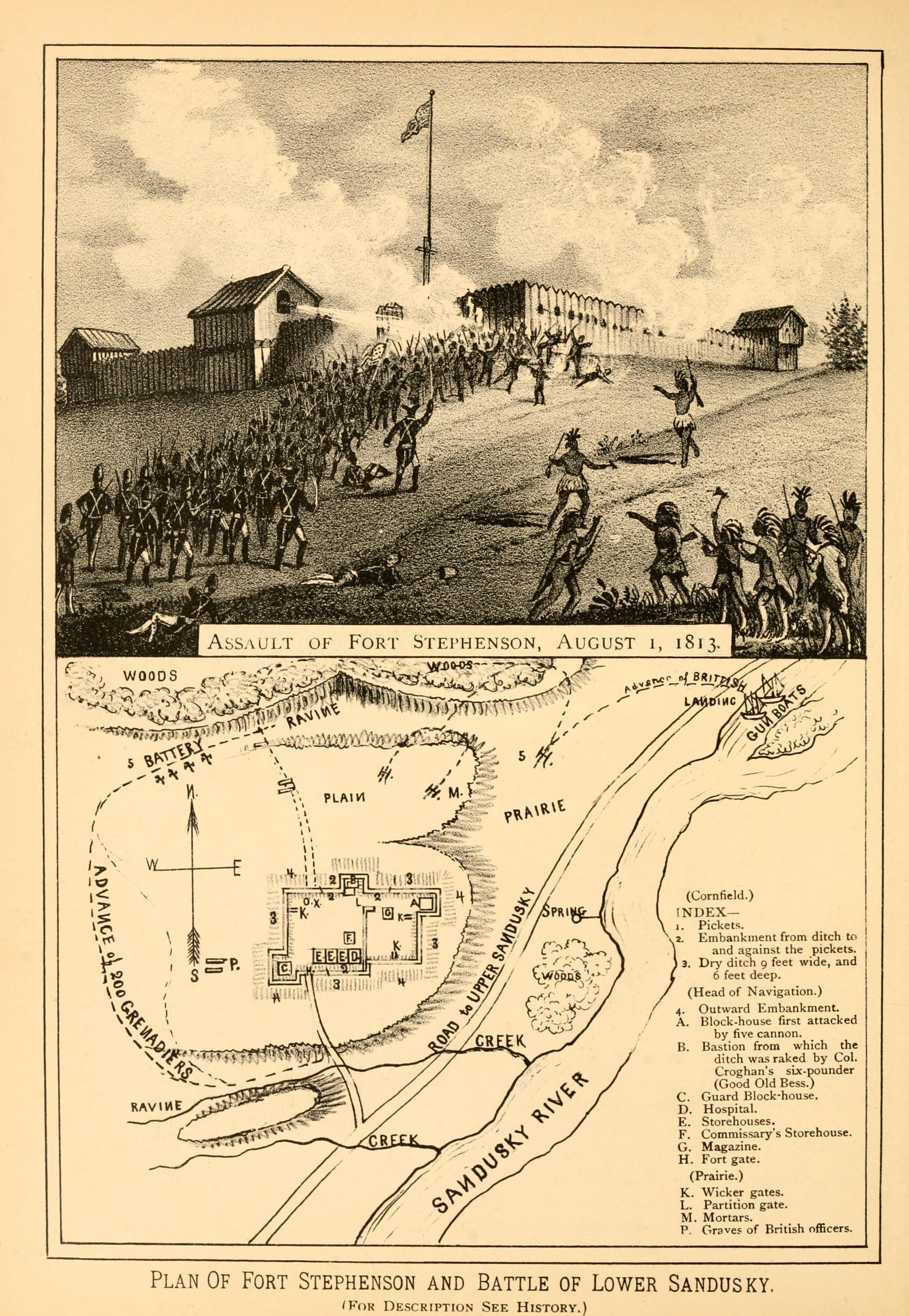
Plan of Fort Stephenson and Battle of Lower Sandusky from The History of Sandusky County published in 1882.

Procter arrived at the mouth of the Sandusky River on July 31, having sailed from Maumee Bay with 391 British regulars. He was joined there by Robert Dickson and Matthew Elliott of the British Indian Department who had brought a few hundred Indigenous warriors overland from Fort Meigs. The combined force, accompanied by two gunboats, arrived at Fort Stephenson the following day.

Estimates of the size of the Indigenous force range from 200 to several thousand. After the battle, Croghan reported to Harrison that the fort was besieged by 500 regulars and 700 to 800 warriors. In his official report Procter does not provide any numbers apart from British casualties but expresses regret that his Indigenous allies barely numbered in the hundreds when he expected thousands. In his 1818 work on the War of 1812, British historian William James questions the reliability of some American accounts and asserts that only 200 warriors were present.

Some sources claim that Tecumseh and 2,000 Indigenous warriors were within a few miles of the fort. Tecumseh's biographer, John Sugden, and Procter's biographer, Sandy Antal, however, both state that only a few hundred had accompanied Dickson and Elliott from Fort Meigs. Sugden suggests that Tecumseh and 2,000 warriors may have remained in the area between the Maumee and Sandusky rivers in case the Americans at Fort Meigs decided to reinforce Fort Stephenson or move towards Detroit. Antal, quoting the Mohawk war leader John Norton, asserts that most of Procter's Indigenous allies returned to Amherstburg with Tecumseh after their failure to take Fort Meigs.

Procter sent Croghan the customary demand for surrender, and Croghan replied with the customary refusal. The gunboats and a howitzer began bombarding the fort and were joined the following morning by three six-pounders. The bombardment had little effect. Croghan returned fire with his single cannon while frequently changing its position in the hopes that the British would believe he had more than one artillery piece. When Croghan's supply of ammunition ran low, he ordered his men to cease fire.

After the arrival of a reinforcement of 115 soldiers from the 41st Regiment of Foot, Procter decided to storm the fort. Brevet Lieutenant Colonel William Shortt was tasked with leading the main attack against the fort's northwest angle. The attack would be proceeded by a two-hour bombardment and a diversionary feint to the fort's south side.

Because the British artillery focused on the northwest angle, Croghan suspected that Procter's forces would strike there, so ordered his men to reinforce the palisade and conceal "Old Betsy" in the blockhouse closest to that location. Shortt launched his attack late in the afternoon of August 2. American gunners surprised them by uncovering "Old Betsy" and firing at point-blank range. Shortt was killed and dozens of others were killed or wounded. A second artillery discharge forced the British column to pull back.

Following this setback, Procter withdrew to Sandusky Bay in the early hours of August 3, and returned back to Amherstburg. British casualties were reported at 26 killed, 41 wounded, and 29 missing. American casualties were just one killed and seven slightly wounded.

== Aftermath ==
The British made no further attempts to attack forts held by the Army of the Northwest. In September, the American naval victory at the Battle of Lake Erie severed Procter's supply line and forced the British to withdraw from Detroit and the Western District of Upper Canada. Harrison occupied Amherstburg on September 28, and defeated Procter at the Battle of the Thames on October 5.

The Battle of Fort Stephenson was a complete victory for the Americans. Harrison praised Croghan in his report to the Secretary of War. Croghan was celebrated as a national hero, brevetted to lieutenant colonel, and gifted an elegant sword by the ladies of Chillicothe, Ohio. In 1835, Croghan was awarded the Congressional Gold Medal.

In 1851, the City of Fremont acquired "Old Betsy" which had been moved into storage at Pittsburgh after the war. The cannon is now located outside the north entrance of the Birchard Library near the 1885 Soldiers' Monument. The library was built in 1878 on the site of Fort Stephenson. In 1906, the remains of George Croghan were removed from the Croghan Family Burying Ground at Locust Grove outside Louisville, Kentucky and reinterred at the base of the Soldiers' Monument.
