= Andrew Holmes (army officer) =

Andrew Hunter Holmes
- Born: Andrew Holmes; 1782; Fairfax County, Virginia, U.S.
- Died: August 4, 1814 (aged 31–32) Mackinac Island, Michigan, U.S.
- Allegiance: United States
- Branch: United States Army
- Rank: Major
- Commands: 32nd Infantry
- Conflicts: War of 1812; Battle of Longwoods; Battle of Mackinac Island

Location of the battle on Mackinac Island where Holmes was killed.

Major Andrew Hunter Holmes (1782—August 4, 1814) born in Fairfax County, Virginia, was an American army officer. He was Captain of the 24th Infantry in the War of 1812 and was promoted to major June 8, 1814. On April 18, 1814, he was Major of the 32nd Infantry. He was victorious at the Battle of Longwoods in Upper Canada but was killed August 4, 1814, in an attack on Fort Mackinac, Michigan, in the Battle of Mackinac Island. Holmes County, Ohio, and Holmesville, Mississippi, are named for him.
