= Battle of Longwoods =

War of 1812 battle

Coordinates: 42°41′39″N 81°42′18″W

- Part of the War of 1812
Date	4 March 1814
Location	Near London in present-day Southwest Middlesex, Ontario
Result	American victory

Belligerents
United Kingdom; Upper Canada Native Americans	United States

Commanders and leaders
James Lewis Basden (WIA)	Andrew Holmes

Strength
240	164

Casualties and losses
14 killed 52 wounded (including 1 prisoner); 1 missing	4 killed 3 wounded

The Battle of Longwoods took place during the Anglo-American War of 1812. On 4 March 1814, a mounted American raiding party defeated an attempt by British regulars, volunteers from the Canadian militia and Native Americans to intercept them near Wardsville, in present-day Southwest Middlesex, Ontario.

== Background ==
In October, 1813, in the aftermath of the American naval victory of the Battle of Lake Erie, an American army under Major General William Henry Harrison recovered Detroit (which the British had captured early in the war), captured the abandoned British post at Fort Malden at Amherstburg, and defeated a retreating British and Native American force at the Battle of Moraviantown, killing the Indigenous leader and British ally Tecumseh in the process. The British feared that the Americans might follow up their victory and strike at their position at Burlington at the western end of Lake Ontario, but the period of enlistment of most of the militia troops in Harrison's army was about to expire, and the Americans withdrew.

During the subsequent months, there was a "no man's land" stretching almost 200 miles (320 km) between Amherstburg and Burlington, where Canadian militia skirmished with occasional American raiding or scouting parties. Late in December, 1813, the British established an outpost at Delaware, roughly halfway between these two positions, and another at Port Talbot on the shore of Lake Erie. On 23 December, the garrison of the post at Delaware surprised and captured a small American outpost near Chatham.

The American commander at Amherstburg was Lieutenant Colonel Anthony Butler of the 28th U.S. Infantry. He sent an expedition under Captain Andrew Holmes to capture one of these two British posts, as circumstances allowed. The expedition consisted of mounted detachments from the 24th, 26th, 27th and 28th U.S. Regiments of Infantry and two six-pounder cannon, and was later joined by some rangers and militia dragoons from Michigan. The raiders, including the regulars, were dressed in buckskins against the cold and were armed with rifles and tomahawks.

== American raid ==
Holmes left Amherstburg on 21 February, moving along the shore of Lake Erie. The ground was soft, and he was forced to abandon his two guns near Pointe au Pelee. After a clash with some Canadian militia who escaped, Holmes decided that the militia would warn the defenders of Port Talbot, and he determined therefore to make for Delaware instead. On 2 March, he was within 15 miles (24 km) of Delaware, but cold, hunger and sickness had reduced his force from 180 to 164 men. The British had indeed been warned of his presence, and Holmes learned from a Canadian renegade that 300 men had sallied from Delaware and were within an hour's march of him. Holmes left the Michigan Rangers as a rearguard while his main body retreated five miles to the Twenty Mile Creek. The Michigan troops also fell back after a skirmish with Caldwell's Rangers, who were leading the British advance.

Holmes was urged by some of his subordinates to retreat further, but he determined to hold his position. He occupied a hill overlooking the bridge over the creek, and fortified the hill with a u-shaped abatis (defences made of felled trees and branches).

Early on 4 March, Caldwell's Rangers exchanged a few shots with the Americans and then feigned a retreat, hoping to draw the Americans out of their defences. Holmes did indeed pursue for 5 miles (8.0 km) before the Michigan Militia Dragoons warned him that the British were preparing an ambush, and he hastily returned to his position.

== Battle ==
The full British force followed up the Americans and arrived at Twenty Mile Creek at 5 p.m. that day. The force consisted of two companies of regulars (the light company of the 1st Battalion, the 1st Regiment of Foot (Royal Scots), numbering 101 men, and the light company of the 2nd Battalion, 89th Regiment of Foot, numbering 45 men), two full-time militia units (the Loyal Kent Volunteers and Caldwell's Western Rangers, numbering 50 men between them) and 44 Native American warriors (Wyandots and Potawatomis under Sauganash, or Billy Caldwell as he was known to the British). In all, this force numbered about 240 men. The British commander at Delaware, Captain Stewart of the Royal Scots, had not expected action and had gone to confer with Colonel Matthew Elliot of the Essex Militia, so the force was commanded by Captain James Lewis Basden of the 89th.

Although Basden had only a rough idea of the ground and American strength from the Rangers' earlier reconnaissance, he nevertheless attacked immediately. He ordered the Rangers and Volunteers to outflank the Americans to the north and the Native warriors to do the same from the south, while he himself led the regulars directly against the front of the American position. The Rangers, militia and Indians crossed the creek out of range of the American position and began skirmishing on the flanks. The regulars opened fire against the American centre, with little effect. Basden then led a charge against the American position. As the British advanced towards the bridge, bunched into a column by the narrow road, the Americans poured a withering fire into them, mowing down the leading troops.

Basden only became aware of the abatis after the British had crossed the bridge, but nevertheless led an advance up the hill. The British were unable to climb the icy slope in the face of the heavy fire and were beaten back. Basden himself was wounded in the leg, and Captain Johnston, leading the light company of the Royal Scots, was killed. The British regulars then fell back into the ravine through which the creek flowed and tried to drive the Americans from the hill with musket fire from behind trees, but the Americans firing from a height inflicted heavy casualties.

On the flanks, the Indians had not pressed their attack. The Rangers had been more successful, but were too few to risk an attack into the American position. As darkness fell at about 6.30 p.m. the entire British force, now commanded by Ensign Mills of the 2/89th, retreated.

The British had suffered 14 killed, 51 wounded, 1 wounded prisoner and 1 missing. The Americans lost 4 killed and 3 wounded.

== Aftermath ==
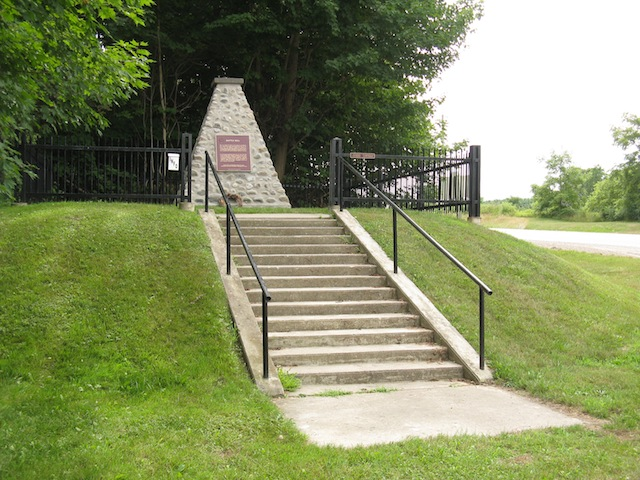
Battle Hill National Historic Site is marked by a federal cairn and plaque.

Although Holmes had defeated Basden's force, he knew he was outnumbered and decided that he would be unable to capture the post at Delaware. At 9 p.m. he abandoned his position at Twenty Mile Creek and retreated to Detroit. The British also later abandoned the outpost at Delaware.

However, the two American 6-pounder guns which Holmes had abandoned near Pointe au Pelee were later discovered by another local Canadian militia unit, the Loyal Essex Volunteers. The Volunteers destroyed the carriages and concealed the guns in a black ash swamp, where they remained to the end of the war.

Holmes was promoted to Major, but was killed a few months later at the Battle of Mackinac Island (1814). Basden recovered from his wound, and later fought at the Battle of Lundy's Lane. At the end of the year, he was temporarily in command of the remnants of the 2/89th Regiment. (He was later made Companion of the Bath after serving in the First Anglo-Burmese War, and returned to Canada to serve during the Rebellions of 1837.)

== Legacy ==
Eight active regular battalions of the United States Army (1-3 Inf, 2-3 Inf, 4-3 Inf, 1-6 Inf, 2-6 Inf, 4-6 Inf, 2-7 Inf and 3-7 Inf) perpetuate the lineages of the old 24th, 27th and 28th Infantry Regiments, all of which had elements that participated in the battle.

The battle site was designated a National Historic Site of Canada in 1924.
