= Matthew Elliott (loyalist) =

British Indian Department officer, merchant and politician

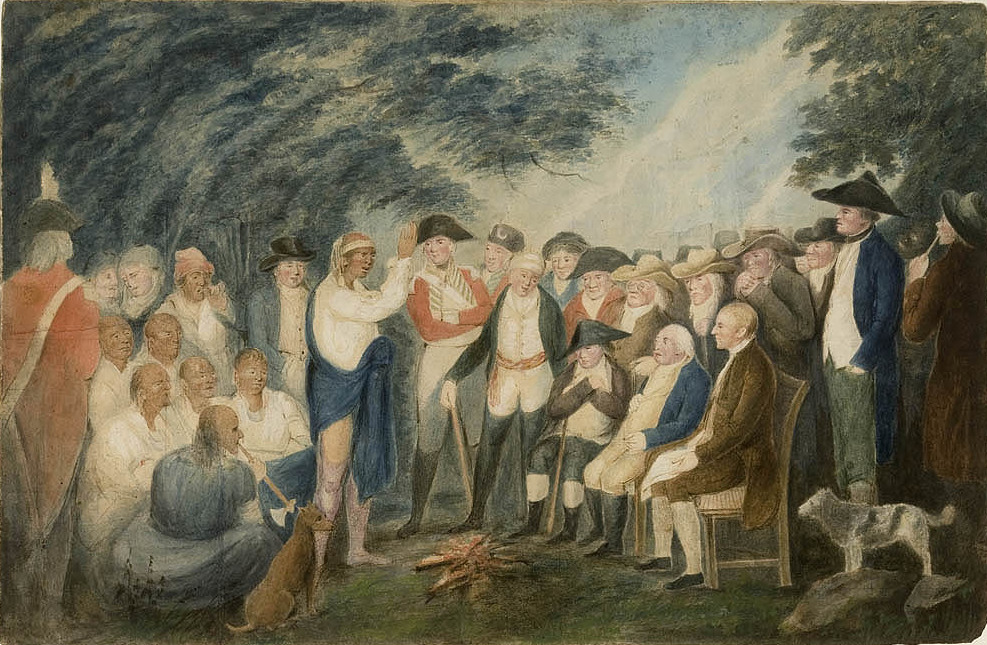
- A possible depiction of Elliott (centre) in The Great Indian Council (1793)
- Born: County Donegal, Ireland
- Died: 1814 (aged 74–75); Burlington, Ontario
- Occupations: fighter, indian agent, slave-owner, judge

Matthew Elliott (c. 1739 – May 7, 1814) was a British Indian Department officer, merchant and politician. He was active in British North America during and after the era of the American Revolution. Elliott held a key position in Anglo-Indian affairs during the time period.

Elliott came to America in 1761 and settled in Pennsylvania during the French and Indian War. As a trader in western Pennsylvania and Ohio in the 1760s and 1770s, and as a captain in the Indian Department during the Revolution, he had lived and fought among the tribes of the Northwest, particularly the Shawnee. He was married to a Shawnee woman and spoke the language fluently, his sympathies with the Indians. With the Shawnee woman, Elliott had two sons named Alexander and Matthew. He later married Sarah Donovan and they had another two sons, Francis Gore and Robert Herriot Barclay.

In 1778 Elliott, along with Alexander McKee and Simon Girty fled to Detroit. He served as a scout on Henry Hamilton's expedition to Vincennes in the autumn of 1778 but left before Hamilton was captured by the Americans in February 1779. For the remainder of the Revolution Elliott served as a British Indian agent.

After the Revolution, Elliott established himself on a farm at what became Amherstburg, Ontario in Upper Canada. He eventually owned over 4,000 acres and numerous slaves, a number of whom he had acquired in the course of raids during the Revolution and refused to relinquish despite government pressure. Elliott is mentioned as a slave owner whose slaves were particularly fearful of. He had installed a lashing ring to a tree in front of his house to instill fear in his slaves; which instead encouraged many to try to escape. In partnership with William Caldwell, he renewed his trading activities, dealing with the Indians of Lake Erie, bringing provisions from Pittsburgh to sell to them as well as in Detroit. Business became so difficult to maintain in such a disputed area, that his company went bankrupt in 1787. Despite this, and the fact that Elliott was illiterate, he became a justice of the peace for the new District of Hesse in 1788. He went on to become superintendent at Amherstburg in 1796, but had been dismissed two years later in 1798 after a dispute over the irregularities in the issuing of provisions.

In 1790, Elliott became assistant to McKee, who was Indian superintendent at Detroit while Elliott continued to encourage the Shawnee and other native groups to oppose American advance across the Ohio River. With McKee, Elliott helped organize the different tribes to resist occupancy and land cessions. Elliott went on to become "superintendent of Indians and of Indian Affairs for the District of Detroit" in the summer of 1796, but by December 1797 he was dismissed. During the next ten years he tried significantly to gain reinstatement, travelling to England in 1804 and even gaining the support of fellow politicians. None of this worked, though from 1800 to 1804, he was a member of the Legislative Assembly of Upper Canada. He was also re-elected in 1804 and 1808, though at these dates he attended meetings less frequently due to other business.

When Anglo-American relations soured again in 1807, the great importance of Elliott's influence among the Indians was recognized and in 1808 he was reappointed superintendent in place of Thomas McKee. By the fall of 1808 it became apparent that the Indians were preparing for war, and the British did not want to be blamed. Elliott worked closely with Tecumseh for an alliance. Before the War of 1812, Elliott had succeeded in gaining the Indian alliance with natives in American territory as well as British.

During the last few months of his life, Elliott led Indian raids on the Niagara frontier. He died from illness in 1814 in the Burlington area of Ontario.
