= Battle of the Thames =

War of 1812 battle

- Part of the War of 1812 and Tecumseh's War
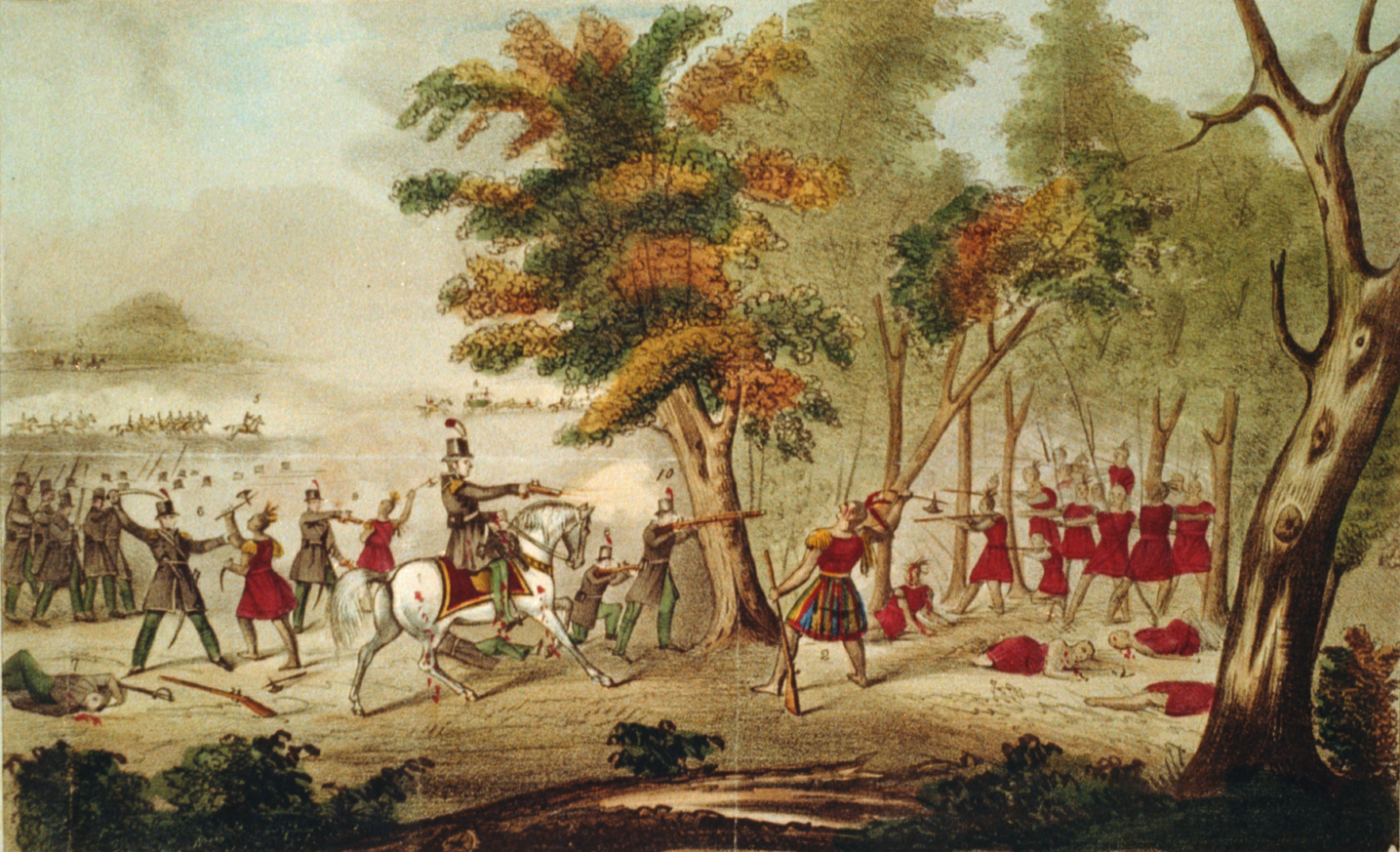
- Colored lithograph depicting the death of Tecumseh at the Battle of the Thames
Date	October 5, 1813
Location	Near Thamesville and the Moravian of the Thames First Nation in Chatham-Kent, Ontario 42°33′45″N 81°55′53″W
Result	American victory

Belligerents
United Kingdom; Tecumseh's Confederacy	United States

Commanders and leaders
Henry Procter; Tecumseh †	William H. Harrison; Richard Mentor Johnson

Strength
950: British: 450 regulars: Indigenous: 500	2,500–3,000: 120 regulars; 1,000 mounted riflemen; 1,580–1,880 militia

Casualties and losses
British: 12–18 killed 22–36 wounded prisoners 601 captured (Note: Includes prisoners taken before, during, and after the battle.); Indigenous: 16–33 killed unknown wounded	11–12 killed 17–20 wounded
- Location within Ontario Battle of the Thames (Great Lakes)

The Battle of the Thames /ˈtɛmz/, also known as the Battle of Moraviantown, was an American victory over British forces and Tecumseh's Confederacy during the War of 1812. The battle took place on October 5, 1813, in Upper Canada near what is now Thamesville, Ontario. The British lost control of the Western District of Upper Canada as a result of the battle. Tecumseh was killed, and his confederacy collapsed.

== Overview ==
In August 1812, British forces commanded by Major General Isaac Brock, supported by Indigenous forces led by Tecumseh, captured Detroit. Detroit was occupied until the Americans gained control of Lake Erie in September 1813, and severed the British supply line. The British Right Division, led by Major General Henry Procter abandoned Detroit, as well as Amherstburg and Sandwich in Upper Canada. Procter withdrew east up the Thames River valley towards Burlington Heights at the head of Lake Ontario. Tecumseh and his followers reluctantly accompanied the British as they retreated.

Procter and Tecumseh made a stand a few miles west of the Christian Delaware settlement of Moraviantown. Major General William Henry Harrison's mounted infantry overran the British lines and engaged the Indigenous warriors who subsequently retreated after Tecumseh was killed. American control of Detroit and the Michigan Territory was reestablished, Amherstburg and Sandwich were occupied, and Procter was later court-martialed for his questionable leadership.

== Background ==
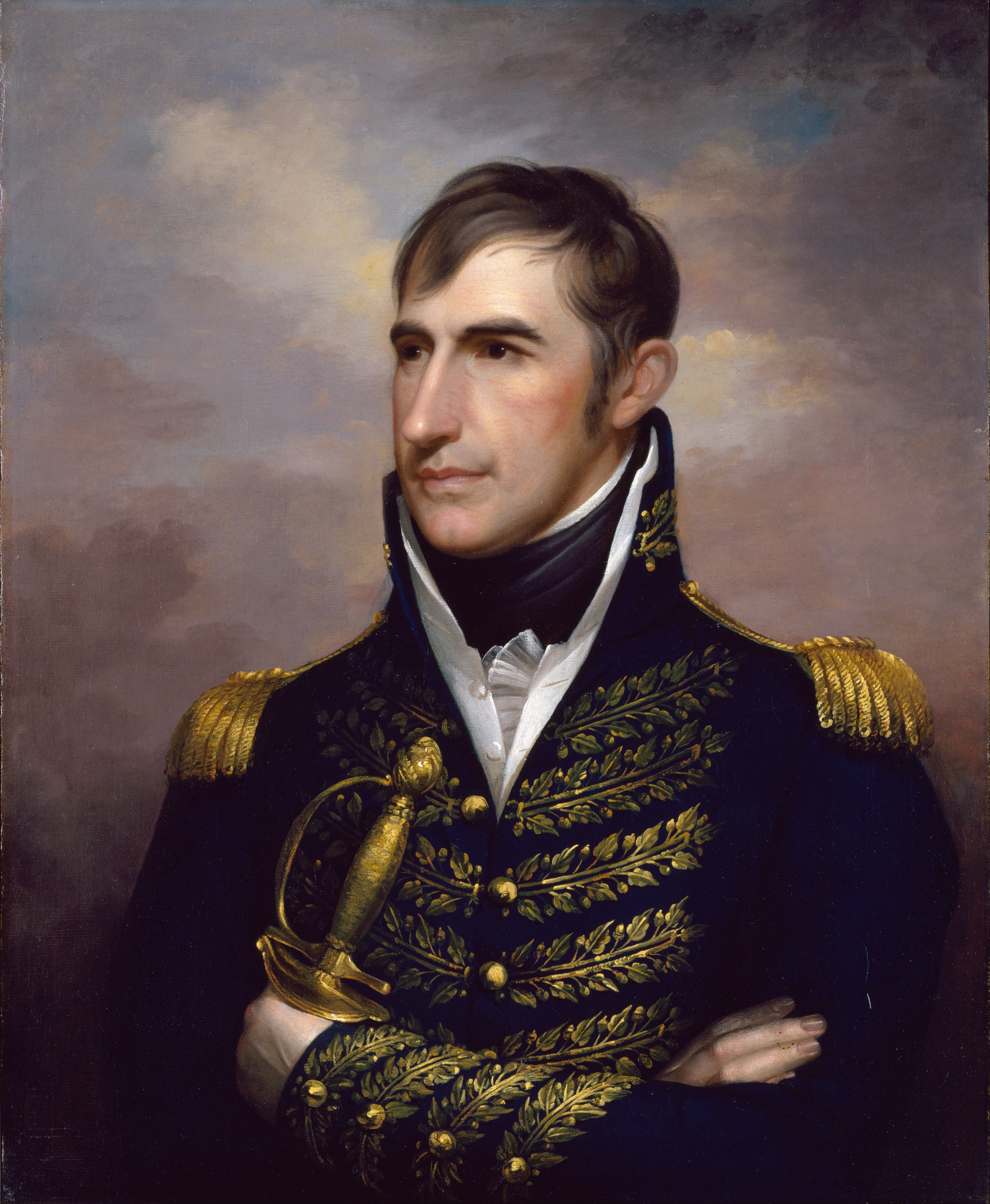
Major General William Henry Harrison led American soldiers in pursuit of the retreating British.

In August 1812, two months after the United States declared war against the United Kingdom, Brigadier General William Hull surrendered Detroit to British and Indigenous forces led by Brock and Tecumseh. In September 1812, Harrison was given command of the American Army of the Northwest and began organizing a campaign to retake Detroit and British occupied Michigan territory and advance into Upper Canada. In January 1813, despite orders to wait for Harrison at the Maumee Rapids, Brigadier General James Winchester advanced to the River Raisin and retook Frenchtown, 33 miles (53 km) southwest of Detroit.

The British Right Division led by then Colonel Henry Procter and supported by Indigenous auxiliaries led by the Wyandot war leader Roundhead defeated Winchester at the Battle of Frenchtown on January 22, 1813. Close to 400 Americans were killed and 547 taken prisoner including Winchester. The costly defeat forced Harrison to cancel plans for a winter campaign to retake Detroit. In recognition of his victory at Frenchtown, Procter was appointed a brigadier, and a few months later was promoted to major general.

The British depended on a steady supply of provisions, munitions and other goods brought to Amherstsburg from Fort Erie at the eastern end of Lake Erie by the vessels of the Provincial Marine. Although the British had maintained control of the lake since the beginning of the war, the American occupation of the west side of the Niagara River following the Battle of Fort George in May 1813 meant that supplies now had to be transported overland from Burlington Heights to Long Point.

In order to wrest control of the lake from the British, the Americans established a naval yard at Erie on Presque Isle Bay and began constructing six vessels including two brigs. In March 1813, Master Commandant Oliver Hazard Perry, arrived to take command. Four other vessels that had been trapped at Black Rock on the Niagara River sailed to Presque Isle Bay in early June.

At Amherstburg, the vessels of the Provincial Marine were turned over to the Royal Navy. Commander Robert Heriot Barclay arrived in early June to take command of the squadron. Barclay was able to keep Perry's squadron trapped inside Presque Isle Bay, but in early August briefly lifted the blockade in order to resupply. Perry took advantage of Barclay's absence to move his vessels across the sandbar at the entrance to the bay and out to the open waters of the lake.

With the supply line from Long Point under threat, Barclay's squadron of six vessels sailed from Amherstburg on September 9 to meet the American flotilla anchored at Put-in-Bay. The following day Perry defeated and captured all six of Barclay's ships at the Battle of Lake Erie. He hastily wrote a note to Harrison stating: "We have met the enemy and they are ours". The victory gave the Americans control of Lake Erie and completely ruptured Procter's supply line. Much of Fort Amherstburg's heavy artillery was lost as the guns had been placed aboard the British ships. Also lost were the men of the 41st Regiment and the Royal Newfoundland Regiment that Procter had assigned to Barclay's squadron as gunners and marines. Most were now prisoners of war.

Harrison immediately began a two-prong operation to retake Detroit and capture Amherstburg. A regiment of mounted infantry led by Colonel Richard Mentor Johnson rode north from Fort Meigs towards Detroit, while Harrison's regulars and militia boarded bateaux and Perry's ships and sailed from Sandusky Bay across Lake Erie to Amherstburg.

== Procter's retreat ==
After receiving word of Barclay's defeat, Procter, without consulting his senior officers, decided to abandon the Detroit frontier and withdraw eastward up the Thames River towards Burlington Heights. Tecumseh, however, knew that a retreat would effectively end British support for his confederation, and attempted to dissuade Procter:

Our fleet has gone out, we know they have fought; we have heard the great guns but know nothing of what has happened to our Father with one Arm [Barclay]. Our ships have gone one way, and we are much astonished to see our Father [Procter] tying up everything and preparing to run the other, without letting his red children know what his intentions are.... We must compare our Father's conduct to a fat animal that carries its tail upon its back; but when affrighted, it drops it between its legs and runs off.

Aware that Harrison was preparing to attack, Procter could not justify defending Amherstburg or Detroit, as provisions were running short and much of his artillery had been removed and mounted on Barclay's vessels. Procter used his remaining three transports and two gunboats to move provisions, stores, munitions, baggage and 229 military dependants across Lake St. Clair to the mouth of the Thames River, and then upriver to the Forks of the Thames (Chatham). Fort Detroit, Fort Amherstburg and the naval yard were torched, and on 27 September, 880 British regulars marched away from Sandwich followed by Tecumseh and 1,200 warriors with their families.

The British retreat up the Thames River valley was slow due to bad roads and incessant rain. Procter was rarely with his men during the retreat and was frequently miles ahead scouting the terrain. He often failed to share his plans with his subordinates, notably his second-in-command, Lieutenant Colonel Augustus Warburton. The British soldiers grew increasingly demoralized, and Tecumseh's warriors grew ever more impatient with Procter for his unwillingness to stop and fight. Procter's Indigenous allies had been led to believe that the Forks had been fortified and that the British would make a stand there. Procter, however, felt that the terrain was unsuitable and that Moraviantown, 20 miles (32 km) further east, offered a better defensive position. Since the river east of the forks was too shallow for larger vessels, essential stores were loaded onto bateaux and sent onwards with the gunboats. All three of the transports were then scuttled and burned.

Late in the afternoon of 27 September, Harrison's main force landed three miles (5 km) below Amherstburg. They advanced to Sandwich the next day. Johnson's mounted infantry arrived at Detroit on September 30 and crossed over the Detroit River to Sandwich on October 1. On October 2, Harrison set off in pursuit of Procter and Tecumseh leaving most of the regulars behind to garrison Detroit, Amherstburg and Sandwich. He was able to move quickly as Procter had failed to destroy the bridges between Sandwich and the mouth of the Thames in order to facilitate the movement of Tecumseh's followers. On October 3, Harrison's forces surprised and captured a small British detachment in the process of destroying a bridge. On October 4, the Americans reached the Forks of the Thames.

Disillusioned by Procter's apparent refusal to make a stand, half of Tecumseh's warriors drifted away. Tecumseh and the remainder fought a brief rearguard action against Johnson's mounted infantry at the Forks but withdrew once Harrison brought up his artillery.

Harrison continued to move swiftly and on the morning of October 5 captured the two British gunboats and most of the bateaux carrying Procter's provisions, ammunition and entrenching tools along with 144 of his men. He caught up with Procter west of Moraviantown in the afternoon of 5 October.

== Forces ==
In his report to John Armstrong, the Secretary of War, Harrison wrote that he fielded 3,000 men on the day of the battle, but later amended that number to 2,500. His force consisted of a detachment of 120 regulars from the 27th U.S. Infantry, five brigades of Kentucky militia led by Major General Isaac Shelby, and the 1,000 men of Johnson's mounted infantry. Also with Harrison was an artillery detachment with two six-pounders, and 260 Indigenous warriors, although neither took part in the battle. All were eager to take revenge for Winchester's loss at Frenchtown on the River Raisin.

Procter's men were mainly from the 41st Regiment, but there were also small detachments from the Royal Newfoundland Regiment, the 10th Royal Veteran's Battalion, the Canadian Light Dragoons, and the Royal Artillery. The veterans of the 1st Battalion of the 41st had been serving in Canada since 1803 and had suffered significant casualties at Frenchtown, Fort Meigs and Fort Stephenson. 179 men who had been aboard Barclay's vessels had been lost at the Battle of Lake Erie. Although recently reinforced by soldiers of the 2nd Battalion, the men of the 41st had suffered from the lack of tents and blankets. Their uniforms were in tatters, and they had not had a proper meal for several days.

Procter had begun the retreat with 880 regulars, but only 450 were present at the battle. The sick and wounded with their attendants had been moved well to the rear as had most of the artillery. A significant number of men had been taken prisoner when Harrison overtook Procter's gunboats, bateaux and wagons on the morning of October 5. Two days earlier Procter had lost 14 men when the detachment sent to destroy a bridge had been captured. Several men had also deserted.

Only about 500 Indigenous warriors remained with Tecumseh. The largest contingents were from the Shawnee and Odawa, but members of the Ojibwe, Wyandot, Potowatomi and other tribes were also present.

== Battle ==
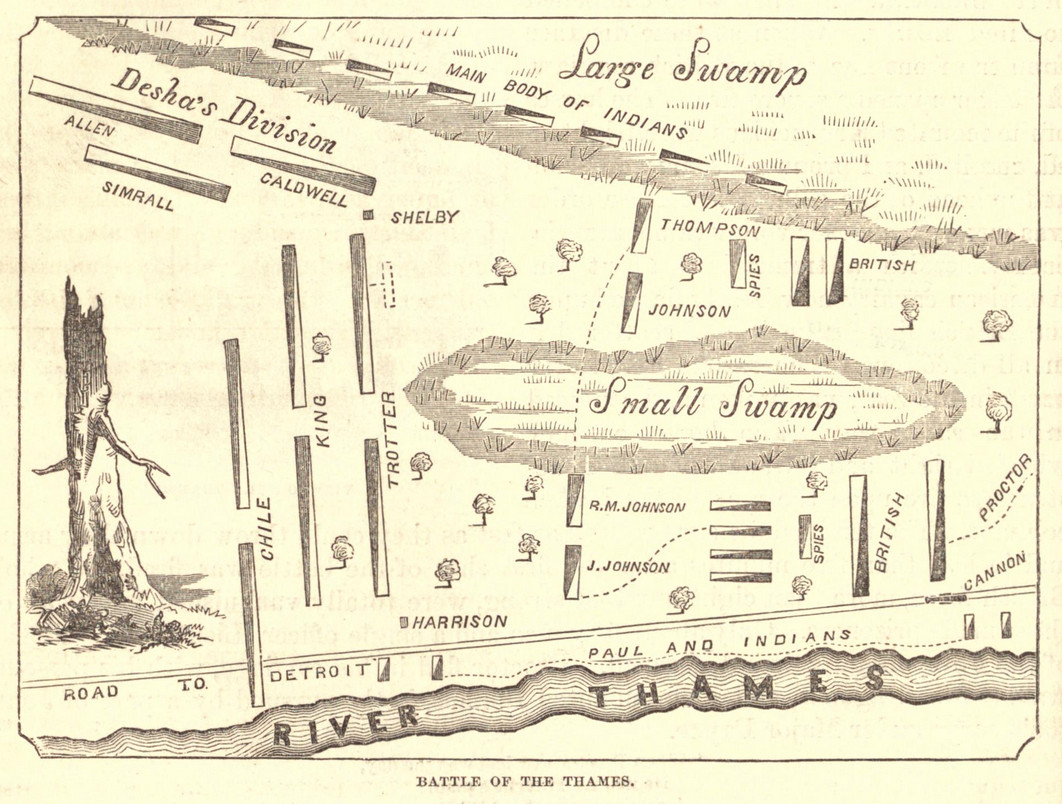
Map of the Battle of the Thames from Lossing's Pictorial Field-Book of the War of 1812 published in 1868

Due to the proximity of the Americans, Procter ordered a halt a mile and a half west of Moraviantown. His men formed two lines in an open wood between the riverbank and a forested swamp known as the Backmetack Marsh. A single artillery piece was positioned astride the road. Due to the lack of tools, the British were unable to construct defensive works such as an abatis that would impede Harrison's mounted troops. Tecumseh's remaining followers positioned themselves in the Backmetack Marsh hoping to outflank the Americans when they attacked Procter's lines. Tecumseh is said to have ridden along the British line, shaking hands with each officer before joining his warriors. Ensign James Cochran observed, "The attack was silently awaited, each determined to do his duty, but few with any doubt as to the result."

Harrison arranged his forces so that while his right faced the British, his left faced the direction from which an Indigenous attack was likely to occur. Instead of a bayonet charge with infantry, Harrison accepted Colonel Johnson's proposal to attack the British with mounted troops. Johnson later amended the plan so that while Lieutenant Colonel James Johnson's battalion would attack the British lines, the second battalion would pass through a small swampy area before moving against Tecumseh's warriors. Meanwhile, 120 regulars would advance along the thickly wooded riverbank and seize the British gun.

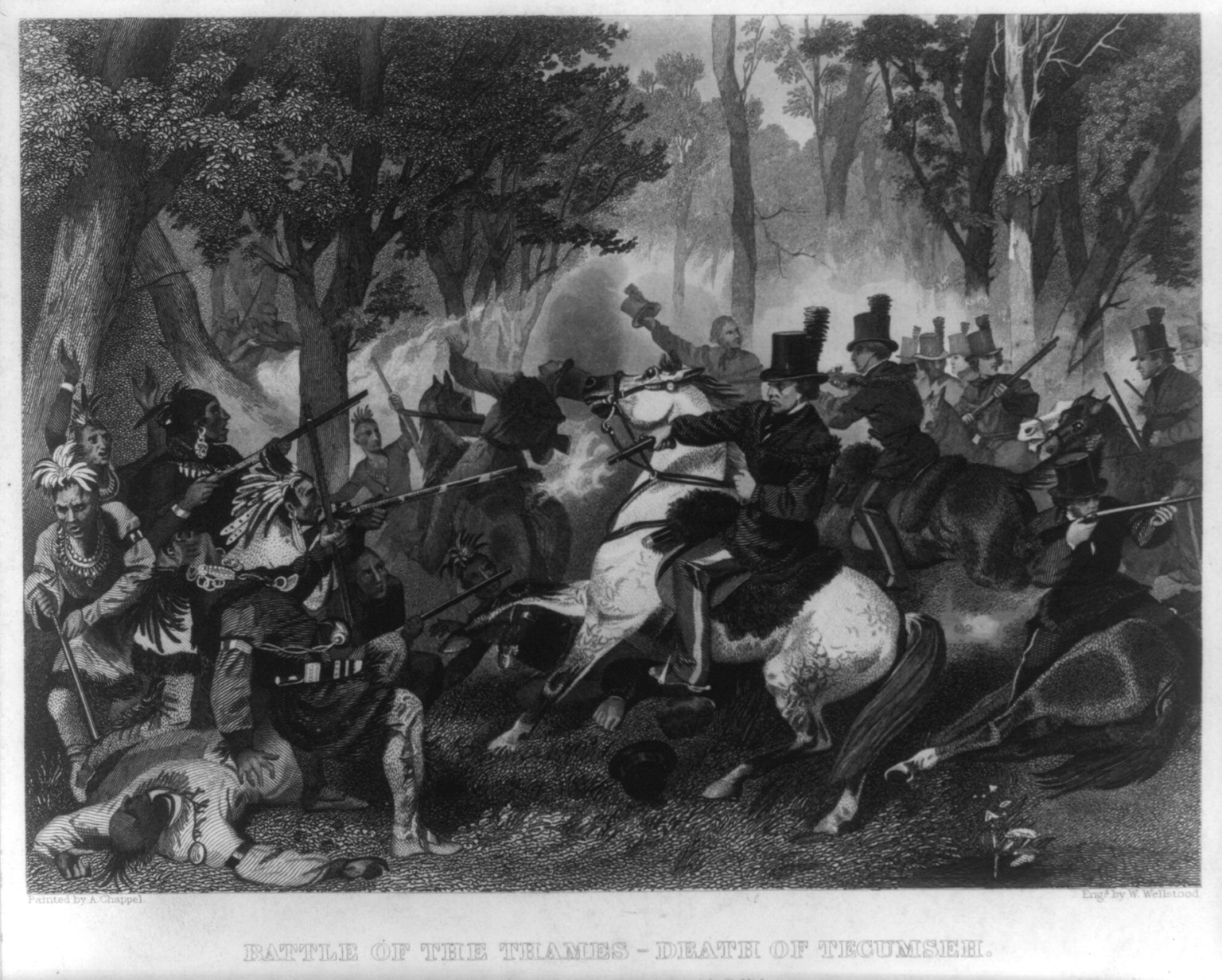
Engraving of a painting by Alonzo Chappel depicting Richard Mentor Johnson killing Tecumseh at the Battle of the Thames

James Johnson's riders charged forward shouting "Remember the Raisin!" The British fired a ragged volley, however, the artillery piece failed to fire before its position was overrun. The Americans hit the British line and forced it to give way. Procter attempted to rally his men but Johnson easily pushed through the second line before swinging around to attack from the rear. The ferocity of the attack caused most of the British to surrender while Procter narrowly escaped capture.

After passing through the small swamp, Richard Johnson formed a "forlorn hope" of 20 men and charged Tecumseh's left flank, drawing fire away from the rest of his men. In the ensuing melee Tecumseh was killed and Johnson seriously wounded. The rest of second battalion charged forward but the entangled growth of the Backmetack Marsh forced them to dismount and fight on foot. Meanwhile, Harrison ordered Shelby's infantry to advance on the Indigenous right. Tecumseh's followers withstood the attack for roughly 30 minutes before breaking contact and withdrawing deeper into the marsh.

Although Warburton and most of the British surrendered, about 50 others escaped the battlefield including Procter. Almost all of those who had been at Moraviantown or further upriver were also able to avoid capture. Procter's carriage, however, along with his baggage and papers including letters from his wife, was taken.

== Casualties ==
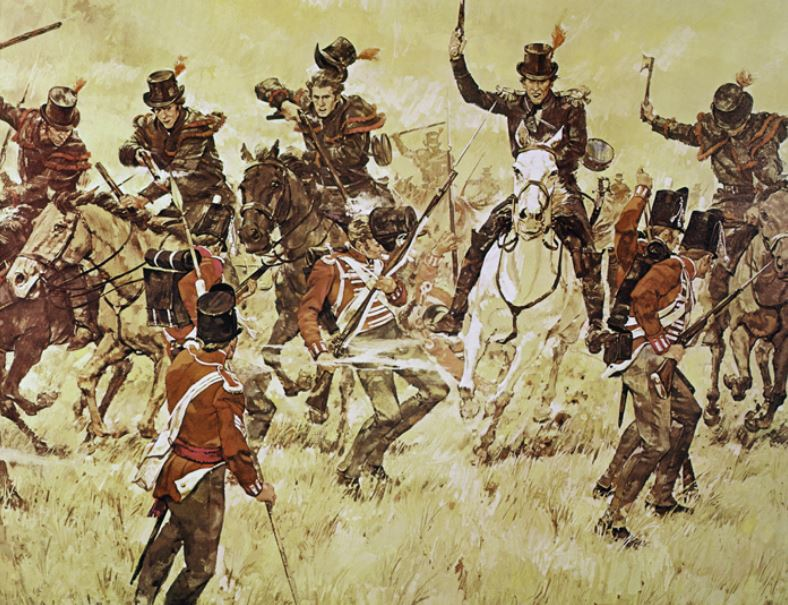
"Remember the River Raisin". Artist Ken Riley's depiction of Kentucky Mounted Rifles charging the British line at the Battle of the Thames

In his report to Armstrong, Harrison stated that his casualties were seven killed and 22 wounded, with five of the wounded having later died of their wounds. He believed that the only casualties inflicted by the British were three of the wounded; all of the rest were caused by Tecumseh's warriors. In a letter to his wife, Major General Isaac Shelby wrote that seven or eight were killed outright, four were fatally wounded, and about 20 were injured. Captain Robert Breckenridge McAfee, a company commander in the Kentucky Mounted Volunteers, recorded in his journal that 10 were killed and 35 wounded.

Harrison further reported that his forces killed 12 British regulars, took 601 prisoners including 23 officers, and that 22 of the prisoners were wounded. Harrison's numbers includes prisoners taken before, during, and after the battle. A few months later, Lieutenant Richard Bullock of the 41st Regiment wrote that 12 regulars were killed and that 36 of the prisoners had been wounded. More than a year after the battle, Lieutenant Colonel Warburton and Lieutenant Colonel William Evans both stated that 18 were killed and 25 were wounded.

The British placed the number of Indigenous fatalities at 16 including Tecumseh. Harrison, however, claimed that the bodies of 33 were found after the battle.

== Aftermath ==
The death of Tecumseh at the Battle of the Thames was a crushing blow for the Confederacy he had created.

Harrison burned Moraviantown then withdrew back to Detroit because the enlistments of the militia were about to expire. His victory led to the Americans reestablishing control of Detroit and the Michigan Territory, and the occupation of Amherstburg and Sandwich for the remainder of the war. Upper Canada's Western District remained comparatively quiet for the rest of the war, apart from skirmishes such as the Battle of Longwoods, and the large-scale incursion led by American Brigadier General Duncan McArthur which resulted in the Battle of Malcolm's Mills on November 5, 1814.

The death of Tecumseh was a crushing blow to the Indigenous alliance he created, and it dissolved after the battle. Harrison signed a truce at Detroit with the representatives of several tribes, although others fought on until the end of the war. Harrison then sailed with Perry to Buffalo with 1,200 regulars leaving behind a garrison of 400 regulars and 1,300 militia. A dispute with the Secretary of War later resulted in Harrison resigning his commission. He remained a popular figure and in 1840, was elected the ninth President of the United States. Harrison died in office a month after his inauguration.

Richard Mentor Johnson is usually credited with killing Tecumseh although other candidates have been proposed including William Whitley, a member of the forlorn hope who was killed. In the years following the war, Johnson represented Kentucky in both the United States House of Representatives and the Senate. He served as the ninth vice president of the United States from 1837 to 1841 under President Martin Van Buren. In his political campaigns, Johnson capitalized on the widespread belief that he had killed Tecumseh, with his supporters chanting "Rumpsey Dumpsey, Rumpsey Dumpsey, Colonel Johnson killed Tecumseh."

Procter gathered what remained of the Right Division at the Grand River, before proceeding to Burlington Heights. On October 17, the Right Division mustered 246 all ranks and was subsequently merged with Major General John Vincent's Centre Division. The remnants of the 41st Foot's 1st Battalion were incorporated into the regiment's 2nd Battalion and saw action at Fort Niagara and Buffalo in December 1813, at Lundy's Lane in July 1814 and Fort Erie in August 1814.

The British soldiers who were taken prisoner were escorted under guard first to Detroit and then overland to Fort Meigs. A few officers were brought across Lake Erie to Fort Stephenson where they joined the prisoners taken at the Battle of Lake Erie. Both groups were then marched to Chillicothe and eventually to Frankford, Kentucky. While enlisted prisoners were accommodated in a fortified camp on the outskirts of the town, the officers found themselves victims of a series of retaliations involving prisoners of war between the United States and Britain, and were held for several months in close confinement in Frankford Penitentiary. Both officers and enlisted were repatriated in the summer of 1814.

Lieutenant General Sir George Prevost, the Governor General of the Canadas, condemned Procter's actions during the retreat. In his report to Lord Bathurst, the Secretary of State for War and Colonies, Prevost held Procter responsible not only for the defeat at the Battle of the Thames, but also Barclay's defeat at the Battle of Lake Erie. Bathurst ordered that a court martial be held, however, the trial was delayed as many of the officers who would be called to testify were still prisoners of war. A court martial finally was convened at Quebec on 21 December 1814 and sat until 28 January 1815. Procter, despite a spirited defence, was found to have been "erroneous in judgment and deficient in energy." He was sentenced to be publicly reprimanded, and was suspended from his rank and pay for six months. The Prince Regent later reduced the sentence to a reprimand but ordered that the findings and sentence be read to every regiment in the Army. The conviction ended Procter's military career.

== Legacy ==
The 1st, 2nd and 4th Battalions of the 6th Infantry Regiment, United States Army perpetuate the lineage of the 27th Infantry Regiment, a detachment of which was with Harrison at the Battle of the Thames.

== Sources ==
- Antal, Sandy (1997). A Wampum Denied: Proctor's War of 1812. Carleton University Press. ISBN 0870134434.
- Antal, Sandy (2008). "Remember the Raisin! Anatomy of a Demon Myth". The Napoleon Series: The War of 1812 Magazine. The Waterloo Association.
- Ashdown, Dana William (2014). "The Thames River Wrecks: A Paper Exploring the Lost Vessels of Major-General Henry Procter's Retreat up the Thames River in the Western District of Upper Canada" (PDF). The Napoleon Series: The War of 1812 Magazine. The Waterloo Association.
- Carter-Edwards, Dennis (1987). "The War of 1812 along the Detroit Frontier: A Canadian Perspective". The Michigan Historical Review. 13 (2): 25–50.
- Coutts, Katherine B. (1964). "Thamesville and the Battle of the Thames". In Zaslow, Morris (ed.). The Defended Border: Upper Canada and the War of 1812. Toronto: MacMillan. pp. 114–120. OCLC 480289.
- Elting, John R. (1991). Amateurs, To Arms! A Military History of the War of 1812. Chapel Hill, North Carolina: Algonquin. ISBN 0-945575084.
- Esarey, Logan, ed. (1922). Messages and Letters of William Henry Harrison. Vol. 2. Indianapolis: Indiana Historical Commission.
- Fredriksen, John C. (2009). The United States Army in the War of 1812: Concise Biographies of Commanders and Operational Histories of Regiments, with Bibliographies of Published and Primary Sources. Jefferson, North Carolina: McFarland and Company. ISBN 978-0786441433.
- Gilbert, Bil (1995). "The Dying Tecumseh and the Birth of a Legend". Smithsonian Magazine.
- Hitsman, J. Mackay; Graves, Donald (1999). The Incredible War of 1812. Toronto: Robin Brass Studios. ISBN 1896941133.
- Hyatt, A. M. J. (1987). "Procter (Proctor), Henry". Dictionary of Canadian Biography. University of Toronto/Université Laval.
- Richardson, John (1902). Casselman, Alexander Clark (ed.). Richardson's War of 1812: With Notes and a Life of the Author. Toronto: Historical Publishing.
- Sugden, John (1985). Tecumseh's Last Stand. Norman, Oklahoma: University of Oklahoma Press. ISBN 0806119446.
- Sugden, John (1997). Tecumseh: A Life. New York: Holt. ISBN 0805041389.
- Skaggs, David Curtis; Altoff, Gerard T. (1997). A Signal Victory: The Lake Erie Campaign, 1812-1813. Annapolis, Maryland: Naval Institute Press. ISBN 978-1557500304.
