= Henry Procter (British Army officer) =

British Army major-general

Major-General Henry Procter
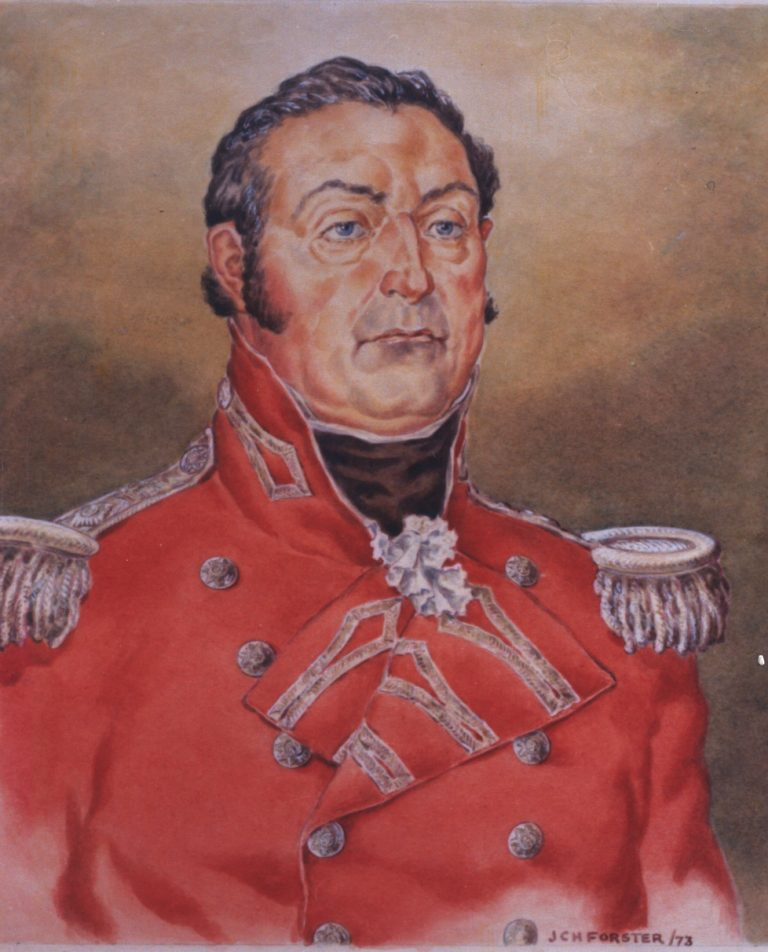
- Portrait by J. C. H. Forster

Civil Governor of British Michigan Territory
- In office 1812–1813
- Monarch: George III
- Regent: George, Prince Regent (1812–1813)
- Governor General: Sir George Prevost
- Prime Minister: The Earl of Liverpool
- Preceded by: Office established William Hull (as American territorial governor)
- Succeeded by: Lewis Cass (as American territorial governor)

Personal details
- Born: c. 1763 Kilkenny, Ireland
- Died: 31 October 1822 Bath, Somerset

Military service
- Allegiance: Great Britain
- Branch/service: British Army
- Years of service: 1781–1815
- Rank: Major-General
- Unit: 41st Regiment of Foot; 43rd Regiment of Foot
- Battles/wars: American Revolutionary War; War of 1812

Major-General Henry Patrick Procter (c. 1763 – 31 October 1822) was a British Army officer who served in Upper Canada during the War of 1812. Procter led British forces at the Battle of Frenchtown and the Siege of Fort Meigs, but is best known for his defeat on 5 October 1813 by American forces at the Battle of the Thames. The loss left the Western District of Upper Canada under American control for the rest of the war.

== Early life ==
Procter was born in County Kilkenny, Ireland in 1763. His father, Richard Procter, was a surgeon in the British Army. Procter began his military career in April 1781 as an ensign in the 43rd Regiment of Foot. He obtained a lieutenancy later that year. Procter served with the 43rd Regiment in the Province of New York in the final months of the American Revolutionary War. After the war he served with his regiment in Ireland and later the West Indies. Procter became a captain in November 1792, was promoted to major in May 1795, and in October 1800 was commissioned a lieutenant colonel in command of the 41st Regiment of Foot. Procter joined his new regiment in Lower Canada in 1802. He served in both Lower and Upper Canada, and was breveted colonel in 1810. His superior officers, including Major General Isaac Brock, noted that Procter's regiment was "very sharp", indicating a good standard of drill and discipline, and that this was due to Procter's "indefatigable industry".

== War of 1812 ==
=== Siege of Detroit ===
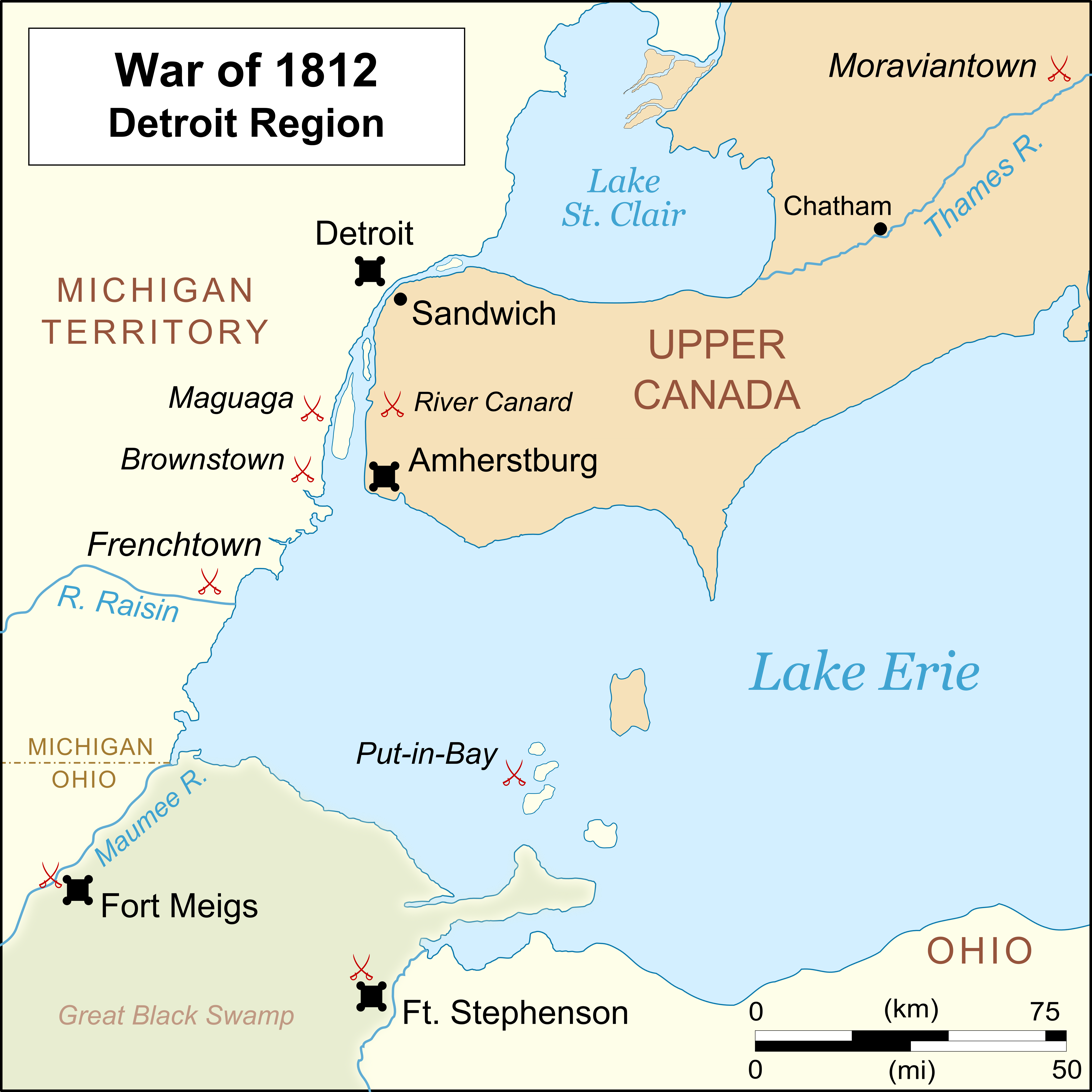
The War of 1812 in the Detroit Region

When the United States declared war on the United Kingdom in June 1812, the 41st Regiment had been stationed in Upper Canada at Amherstburg and Niagara for a number of years. In addition to commanding the 41st Regiment, Procter also had command of Niagara's Fort George. On 12 July 1812, an American army under Brigadier General William Hull crossed the Detroit River and occupied Sandwich (now Windsor). A few skirmishes occurred with British pickets along the Canard River north of Amherstburg. Hull decided that he could not take Amherstburg's Fort Malden without heavy artillery, which could not be brought forward because the carriages were in a poor state of repair. Major General Brock, who was in charge of all British forces in Upper Canada, dispatched Procter to Amherstburg to take over as commander of Fort Malden, and defend the fort and the Amherstburg Navy Yard against American attack.

Procter arrived at Amherstburg on 26 July. In a letter to Brock requesting reinforcements, he wrote: "Five hundred on the 41st, would, I am confident, soon decide matters." With the help of the influential Shawnee war leader Tecumseh, whose 200 warriors were based at Amherstburg, Procter convinced the reluctant Wyandot led by Roundhead to support the British. On 2 August, Procter dispatched two companies of the 41st Regiment under the command of Captain Adam Muir across the river to the Wyandot village of Brownstown. Muir orders were to block the American supply train that was at Frenchtown on the Raisin River waiting for an escort from Detroit. On 4 August, Tecumseh and a small group of his followers ambushed a column of 200 militia led by Major Thomas Van Horne as it moved south from Detroit, killing 17 and wounding 12. Two bags of mail from Detroit were dropped by the panicked militia containing letters that revealed growing dissatisfaction within Hull's forces.

On 6 August, Hull ordered 600 regulars and militia under Lieutenant Colonel James Miller to secure the supply route to Frenchtown. To stop Miller from succeeding, Muir advanced north to the abandoned Wyandot village of Maguaga with 90 regulars and 50 men from the Essex Militia, supported by Tecumseh and his warriors. Once in position, Muir was reinforced by 60 additional regulars who had arrived at Amherstburg that morning. The Battle of Maguaga began late in the afternoon on 9 August when Muir opened fire on the approaching American column. Miller deployed his men into line and advanced under heavy fire. Muir ordered a charge, however, the bugle call was misinterpreted by the newly arrived regulars who began to fall back. As Miller pressed forward his attack, Muir ordered a retreat. Screened by Tecumseh's warriors, the British made an orderly withdrawal back to Brownstown and then crossed the river to Amherstburg. Despite scoring a tactical victory, the Americans suffered 18 killed and 64 wounded. The British had 4 killed, 19 wounded and two taken prisoner. Miller remained at Maguaga until he was ordered back to Detroit on 11 August, while the supply train remained stalled at Frenchtown.

Hull began withdrawing his troops from Sandwich on 8 August. Once the Americans had departed, Procter ordered the construction of an artillery battery at Sandwich on the grounds of the François Baby House, formerly Hull's headquarters. The battery consisted of one 18-pounder, two 12-pounders and two 5½-inch mortars manned by gunners from the Provincial Marine.

Brock arrived at Amherstburg with additional reinforcements on the evening of 13 August. He credited Procter with having "compelled the enemy to retreat and take shelter under the guns of his fort." On 15 August, Brock sent a letter demanding Hull's surrender. When Hull refused, Brock ordered the battery at Sandwich to open fire. Brock was determined to take offensive action despite the misgivings of Procter and many of the other senior officers. Tecumseh and roughly 600 warriors crossed the river that night. On the morning of 16 August, Brock and Procter crossed the river with 330 regulars and 400 militia, and advanced on Detroit.

Following his initial refusal to surrender, Hull had become increasingly despondent. He was responsible not only for his soldiers but also for hundreds of civilians including his daughter and grandchildren. He lacked confidence in his men, believed he was outnumbered, and above all feared a massacre should he lose. Despite having a strong defensive position, Hull ordered his artillery not to return fire. After several of his soldiers were killed during the British bombardment, Hull decided that surrender was the only option. Hull and 582 regulars were sent to Quebec as prisoners of war, while the militia, numbering about 1,600, were paroled and escorted home.

=== Battle of Frenchtown ===
Brock departed Amherstburg on 19 August leaving Procter in command of the Detroit frontier. Procter was soon faced with a campaign led by American Brigadier General William Henry Harrison to retake Detroit and advance into Upper Canada.

On 14 September 1812, Procter sent a detachment of regulars and militia led by Muir, accompanied by several hundred Wyandot led by Roundhead, to support the siege of Fort Wayne. Procter was unaware that the Potawatomi had ended the siege three days earlier just before the fort was relieved by a substantial reinforcement led by Harrison. On 25 September, as Muir ascended the Maumee River, his scouts skirmished with scouts from a brigade led by Brigadier General James Winchester that was advancing down the river from Fort Wayne. Aware that he was badly outnumbered, Muir withdrew back to Amherstburg.

In late December, Winchester received orders to move his regulars and Kentucky militia from his encampment at the confluence of the Maumee and Auglaize rivers down to the Maumee Rapids. At the rapids he learned that Frenchtown, 38 miles (61 km) to the north, was lightly defended by two companies of the Essex militia and only a few hundred Potawotomi. Although he had been ordered to wait at the rapids for Harrison, Winchester dispatched 700 men under Lieutenant Colonel William Lewis to retake Frenchtown. On 18 January, during the 1st Battle of Frenchtown, Lewis's men charged across the frozen Raisin River in an attack that forced the Essex Militia to withdraw. In the running battle that followed, 12 Americans were killed and 55 wounded. Meanwhile, the Essex militia suffered only a single fatality.

Two days later, Winchester joined Lewis at Frenchtown with additional men, but did little to prepare the position for a possible British counterattack. Although the village was partially surrounded by a simple palisade, only the Kentucky militia took shelter inside the enclosure, while Wincester's regulars established a camp immediately to the east. On 21 January, Winchester was repeatedly warned that a large enemy force led by Procter had crossed the frozen Detroit River and was heading towards the village, but dismissed the reports as "impossible rumour."

Procter had assembled close to 600 regulars, militia, and Provincial Marine sailors, and was accompanied by six artillery pieces and about 600 Indigenous warriors led by Roundhead. Before dawn on 22 January, Procter deployed his soldiers into a line 250 yards (230 m) north of the village while his Indigenous allies took up positions to either side.

Shortly after Procter ordered the advance, an American drummer had begun to sound reveille. An American sentry spotted the approaching British and discharged his musket. The Americans scrambled into position to meet the attack. While the Kentucky militia were protected by the palisade, the regulars were out in the open. After a intense firefight that lasted about 25 minutes, Winchester's regulars began to give way. Two companies of militia tried to reinforce the regulars, however, the warriors on the British left surged forward driving the Americans towards the river. Winchester and Lewis tried in vain to form a second line at the riverbank but the withdrawal had become a rout. Panicked men fled across the river unaware that the warriors on the British right had circled around to the American rear and were blocking the escape route. Only 33 men managed to avoid death or capture. About 220 were killed and 147 men including Winchester and Lewis were taken prisoner.

Meanwhile, the Kentucky militia held their ground behind the palisade. Over the next few hours they repulsed three British frontal assaults and inflicted heavy casualties on the gunners who had moved the artillery to within 50 yards (46 m) of the palisade. Procter finally pulled his men back and waited for his Indigenous allies to return. When Roundhead brought Winchester to the British line, Procter insisted that the American general order the holdouts to surrender. The senior surviving Kentucky militia officer, Major George Madison, initially refused since Winchester was a prisoner, but soon agreed to terms.

In total, the Americans suffered 397 killed and 547 taken prisoner. British casualties totalled 23 killed and 185 wounded.

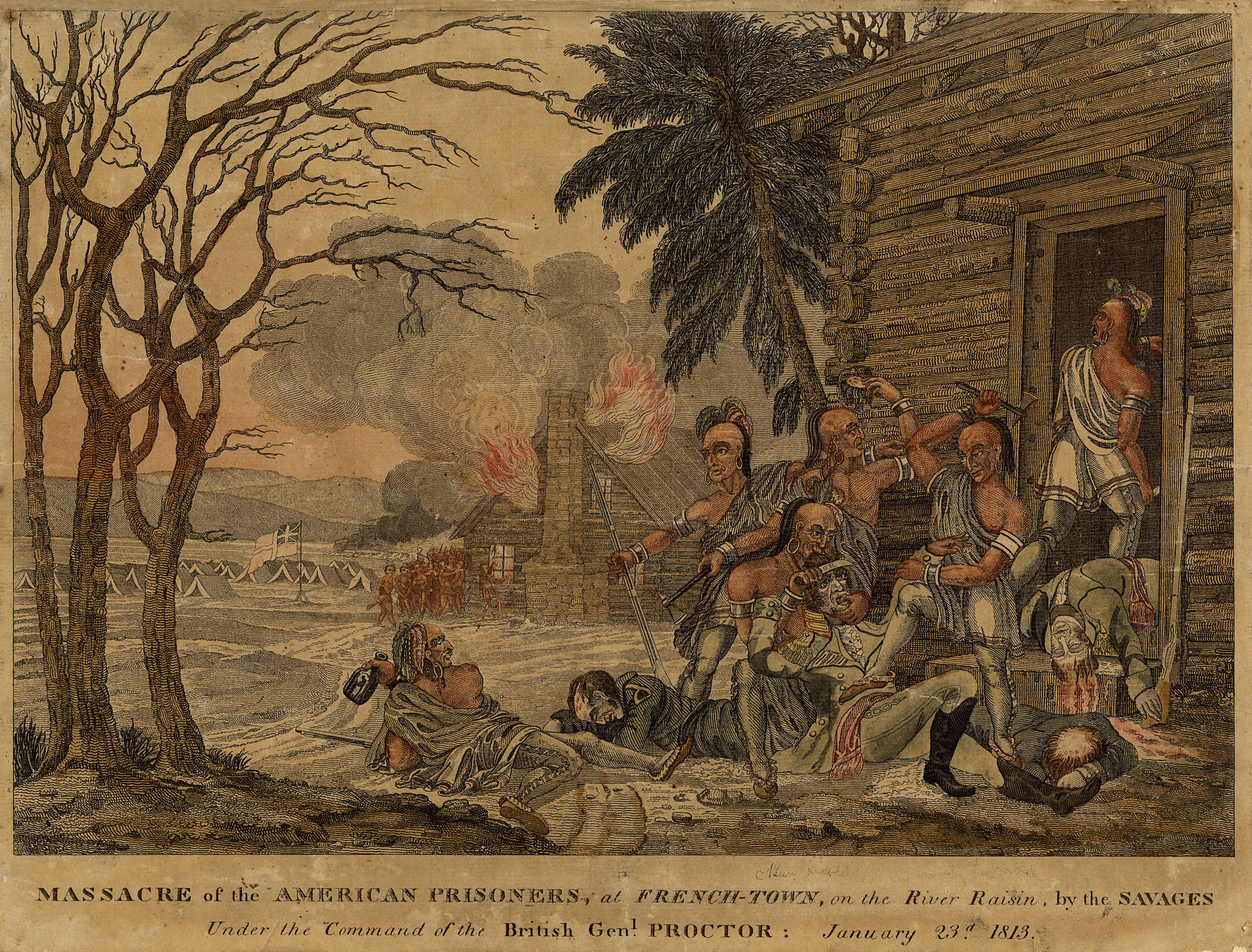
Massacre of American Prisoners at French-town on the River Raisin. This print received wide circulation through recruiting posters issued by the United States War Department. (Clements Library, University of Michigan)

After receiving a false report that Harrison was approaching from the south, Procter ordered an immediate withdraw back to Amherstburg. Since there was a shortage of sleighs, 64 badly wounded prisoners were left behind under the care of a few attendants. Early on the morning of 23 January, about 200 Indigenous warriors entered the village. They robbed the wounded prisoners of their clothing and blankets, killed those unable to walk, and burned the two makeshift hospitals. The survivors were taken away but those who struggled to keep up with their captors were killed. Most were brought to Amherstburg and ransomed by Procter. A contemporary report identified nine victims and estimated that an additional 15 to 18 were killed. This number was greatly inflated in later accounts.

The Battle of Frenchtown is widely known as the "Raisin River Massacre." Reports of the slaughter were quickly exaggerated in wartime propaganda, with political cartoons and recruitment broadsides depicting a drunken massacre and scalping by “savages” abetted by the British. The slogan "Remember the Raisin!" was used to encourage enlistment, and was adopted as a battle cry.

In recognition of his victory at Frenchtown, Procter was appointed a brigadier general, and a few months later was promoted to major general.

=== Fort Meigs ===
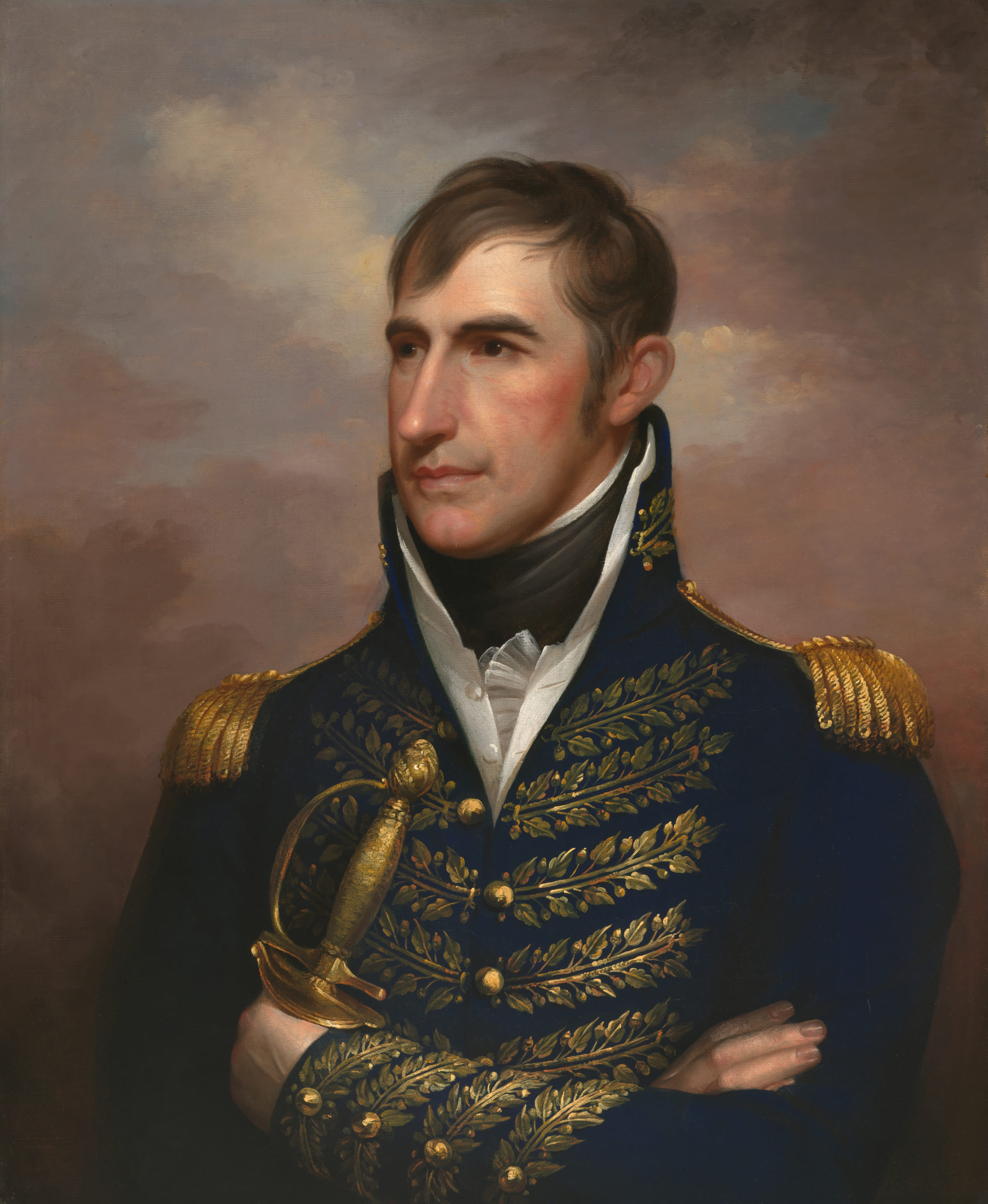
William Henry Harrison c. 1813 by Rembrandt Peale, National Portrait Gallery

Harrison had been en route to Frenchtown with reinforcements when news of Winchester's defeat reached him. He withdrew to the Maumee Rapids, ordered Winchester's stores burned, then pulled his soldiers back to the Portage River. A month later Harrison returned to the Maumee River to begin construction of a substantial fortification which he named Fort Meigs. He received instructions to suspend offensive operations until the warships being constructed at Black Rock and Erie were ready to sail and provide support for another attempt to retake Detroit.

In March, Procter learned from Roundhead that Harrison had returned to the Maumee. Although some of his Indigenous allies advocated an immediate attack, Procter decided he needed to wait until the ice on Lake Erie had cleared. Two more companies of the 41st Foot and a detachment of Royal Artillery gunners had arrived at Amherstburg, so Procter felt he had the necessary strength to besiege the American fort. When Harrison became aware of Procter's preparations he persuaded the Governor of Kentucky to call up a brigade of 1,200 militia under Brigadier General Green Clay. Clay's brigade started down the Maumee River to Fort Meigs, but failed to reach the fort before Procter arrived.

After several delays caused by heavy rain, Procter and 533 regulars embarked aboard the vessels of the Provincial Marine on April 23 and sailed across Lake Erie to Maumee Bay. 462 militia followed in batteaux. Tecumseh, who had recently returned to Amherstburg, led roughly 1,200 warriors overland and rendezvoused with Procter on 29 April.

Procter established his headquarters at the abandoned Fort Miami. Procter had Tecumseh lightly invest Fort Meigs while four artillery batteries were established on the north side of the river opposite the fort. On 1 May, two 24-pounder guns, three 12-pounder guns, an 8 inch howitzer, two 5½-inch howitzers, two 5½-inch mortars, and two gunboats mounting 9-pounder guns opened fire on the fort.

The bombardment caused little damage due to the bombproofs and traverses that Harrison had ordered constructed. Harrison ordered his artillery to return fire but his supply of ammunition was limited and the shelling had little effect. On 3 May, Procter sent a letter to Harrison demanding the surrender of Fort Meigs in order to prevent the "effusion of blood." After Harrison refused, Procter had an additional battery placed on the south side of the river 300 yards (270 m) east of the fort.

Harrison received word on the evening of 4 May that Clay's brigade was encamped just a few hours upriver. He decided he would use Clay's men to silence the British guns and dispatched a messenger with his plans. Colonel William Dudley and 800 men from Clay's brigade were to land on the north side of the river and attack the British artillery emplacements. Dudley's orders were to spike the guns, then return to the boats and cross the river to the fort. Clay and the rest of the brigade would land on the south side of the river and fight. Meanwhile a sortie would attack and destroy the British battery to the east.

Dudley, however, failed to adequately brief his men. They quickly drove off the British artillerymen, but the spikes had been misplaced so the guns could not be easily disabled. When his men came under fire from Indigenous snipers, Dudley ignored his orders and set off in pursuit with the bulk of his men and was drawn into an ambush. In the fighting that ensued, several hundred were killed or taken prisoner. Dudley was shot, tomahawked, and mutilated. Only 150 men of Dudley's detachment escaped to the boats and eventually reached the safety of the fort.

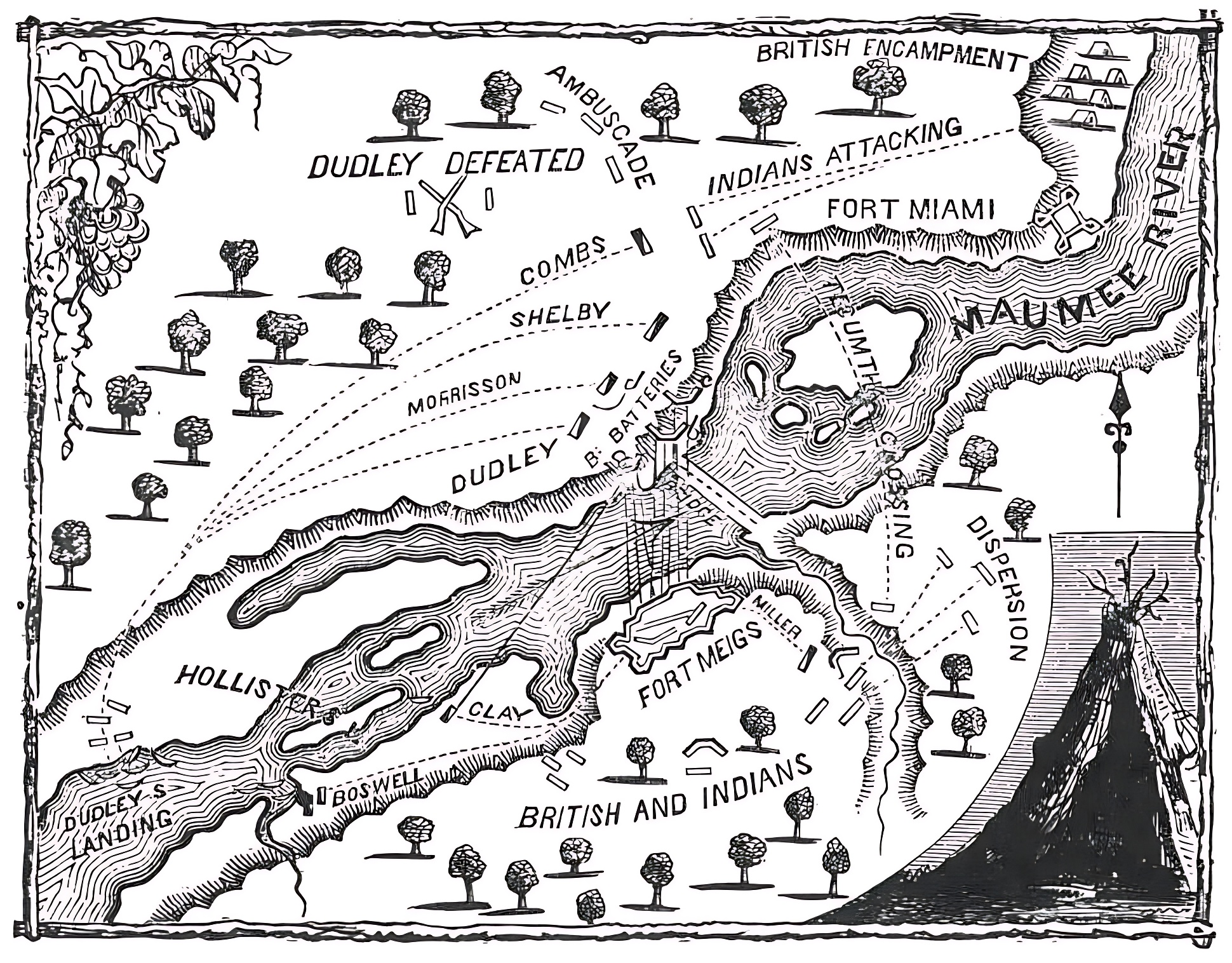
The Siege of Fort Meigs

Three companies of the 41st retook the batteries after a brief and disorganized resistance by the Americans who had remained behind with the guns. On the opposite side of the river, Clay successfully reached the fort with only a few casualties from Indigenous snipers. A 350-man detachment of regulars from the fort overran the British artillery position to the east, spiked the guns and took 44 prisoners.

Although some of the American captives were led away by their Indigenous captors, most were brought to Fort Miami and turned over to the British. While under British guard inside the fort, the unarmed prisoners were suddenly attacked by a group of Ojibwe. One British soldier was killed when the guards attempted to intervene. Close to two dozen prisoners were killed before Tecumseh and two British Indian Department officers were able to stop the bloodshed. By nightfall all the prisoners had been secured aboard the Provincial Marine vessels anchored at the mouth of the river.

Several hours later Procter received a letter from Harrison proposing a prisoner exchange. Procter and Harrison met the following morning and arranged for 21 American prisoners to be swapped for the British soldiers captured when the artillery position east of the fort was overrun.

On 9 May, Procter abandoned the siege as his Indigenous allies had drifted away following Dudley's defeat. Half of Procter's militia had also left citing the need to return to their homes and begin spring planting.

The British official casualty return for the siege gave 14 killed and 40 wounded. Procter reported 547 American prisoners had been taken with 80 later brought in by Tecumseh's followers. Harrison reported that the siege resulted in 160 fatalities but only 12 were the result of British artillery fire on the fort.

=== Sandusky and Put-in-Bay ===
After returning to Amherstburg, Procter was faced with a critical shortage of men and supplies. The Battle of York in April and the American occupation of the west side of the Niagara River following the Battle of Fort George in May meant that few reinforcements were available. Meanwhile supplies now had to be transported overland from the head of Lake Ontario to Long Point. Procter was also aware that the Americans had established a naval yard at Erie on Presque Isle Bay and were in the process of constructing six vessels including two brigs. Four other vessels that had been trapped at Black Rock on the Niagara River sailed to Presque Isle Bay in early June following the British withdrawal from Fort Erie.

In early June, Lieutenant Robert Barclay and a small Royal Navy contingent arrived at Amherstburg and took over operation of the Provincial Marine. Procter and Barclay considered launching an attack on Erie but had to abandon the idea due to the shortage of naval stores and sailors, and the refusal of Procter's immediate superior, Major General Sir Francis de Rottenberg, to send the rest of the 41st Regiment to Amherstburg.

Procter instead decided to raid Harrison's supply depot on the Sandusky River. His Indigenous allies, however, led by Tecumseh, insisted on a second attack on Fort Meigs. Following an unsuccessful attempt to draw the American garrison out of the fort in late July, Procter moved east and attacked Fort Stephenson on the Sandusky River in early August. Over the course of two days the severely outnumbered garrison of roughly 160 men, under the leadership of Major George Croghan, repelled all attacks. The British suffered 96 casualties before Procter decided to withdraw back to Amherstburg.

During the month of July, Barclay blockaded Erie to prevent the American fleet from sailing. For reasons unknown, he raised the blockade on 31 July and sailed across Lake Erie to Long Point. Barclay returned on August 4 to discover that the Americans had used his absence to move their ships out onto the lake and could now threaten the movement of supplies from Long Point to Amherstburg.

Reinforcements slowly trickled in to Amherstburg during the month of August. By the beginning of September, Procter had 1130 regulars under his command, although 250 men of the 41st and Royal Newfoundland regiments were serving aboard the vessels of the Lake Erie squadron. Barclay finally received a reinforcement of 41 Royal Navy sailors on 6 September. Procter and Barclay agreed that in order to fully reopen their supply line to Long Point they needed to risk a naval engagement. Three days later Barclay departed Amherstburg aboard the newly built but undermanned HMS Detroit. His squadron of six vessels proceeded across the lake to meet the American flotilla of nine vessels anchored at Put-in-Bay.

On 10 September 1813 at the Battle of Lake Erie, the American squadron, under the command of Oliver Hazard Perry defeated and captured all six of Barclay's ships. The victory gave the Americans control of Lake Erie and completely ruptured Procter's supply line. Much of Fort Amherstburg's heavy artillery was lost as the guns had been placed aboard Detroit. Also lost were the 250 regulars that Procter had assigned to Barclay's squadron since most were now prisoners of war.

=== Battle of the Thames ===
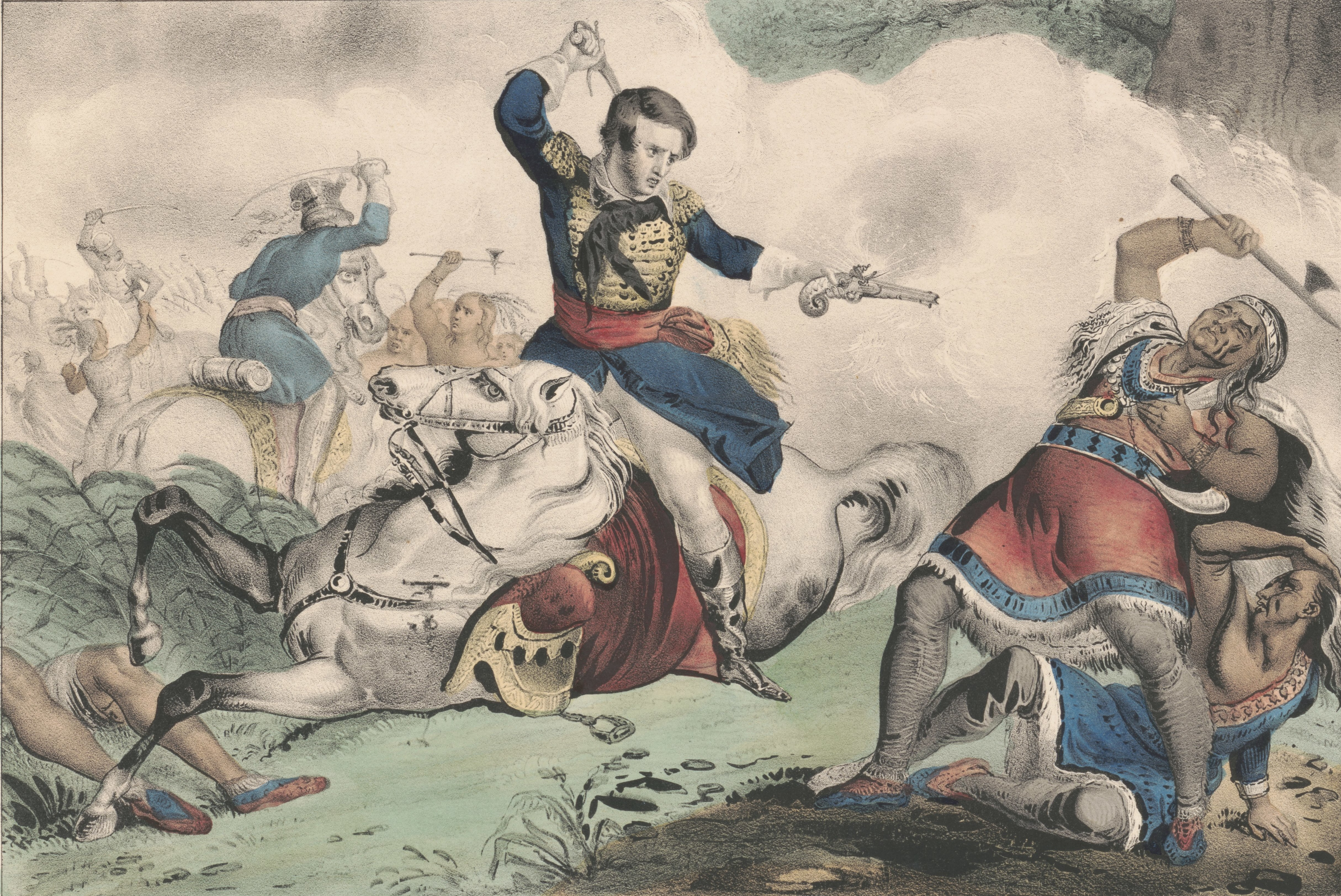
Death of Tecumseh: Battle of the Thames. Lithograph published in 1846 by Nathaniel Currier.

Procter's situation was precarious. Short of provisions and ordnance, and aware that Harrison was preparing to attack, Procter decided to abandon Amherstburg, Detroit and Sandwich and withdraw eastward up the Thames River. Tecumseh reviled the British general for retreating "as a fat animal that carries its tail upon its back; but when affrightened, it drops it between its legs and runs off." Procter, however, was able to convince Tecumseh that retreat was necessary and assured him that he would make a stand on the Thames. Proctor used the remaining three transports and two gunboats at Amherstburg to move provisions, stores, ordnance, baggage and 229 military dependents across Lake St. Clair to the mouth of the Thames River, and then upriver to the Forks of the Thames (Chatham). Fort Detroit, Fort Amherstburg and the naval yard were torched, and on 27 September, Procter's 880 British regulars marched away from Sandwich followed by Tecumseh with 1,200 warriors and their families.

The British retreat up the Thames River valley was slow due to bad roads and incessant rain. Proctor was rarely with his men during the retreat and was frequently miles ahead scouting the terrain. He often failed to share his plans with his subordinates notably his second-in-command, Lieutenant Colonel Augustus Warburton.

Procter's Indigenous allies had been led to believe that the Forks had been fortified and that the British would make a stand there. Procter, however, felt that the terrain was unsuitable and that Moraviantown, 20 miles (32 km) further east, offered a better defensive position. Since the river east of the forks was too shallow for larger vessels, essential stores were loaded onto batteaux and sent onwards with the gunboats. All three of the transports were then scuttled and burned.

Harrison with 3,000 regulars and militia began landing at Amherstburg from Perry's vessels late in the afternoon of 27 September. He advanced to Sandwich the following day, and set off in pursuit of Procter and Tecumseh on 31 September, leaving 500 men behind to garrison Detroit, Amherstburg and Sandwich. On 1 October, Harrison was joined by 500 mounted infantry from Kentucky led by Colonel Richard Johnson who had followed the road from the Maumee Rapids to Detroit then crossed over the river to Sandwich. Harrison was able to move quickly as Procter had failed to destroy the bridges between Sandwich and the mouth of the Thames in order to facilitate the movement of Indigenous refugees. Harrison forces reached the Forks of the Thames on 4 October.

Disillusioned by his apparent refusal to make a stand, half of Procter's Indigenous allies drifted away. Tecumseh and the remainder briefly fought a rearguard action against Johnson's mounted infantry at the Forks but withdrew once Harrison brought up his artillery.

Harrison caught up with Procter west of Moraviantown in the afternoon of 5 October. The Americans had moved swiftly and captured the two gunboats and most of the batteaux carrying Procter's provisions, ammunition and entrenching tools along with 144 of his men. Due to the proximity of the Americans, Procter had his infantry form lines in an open wood between the riverbank and a forested swamp known as the Backmetack Marsh. A single artillery piece was positioned astride the road. Due to the lack of tools, the British were unable to construct defensive works such as an abatis that would impede Harrison's mounted troops. Tecumseh and his remaining followers positioned themselves in the Backmetack Marsh hoping to outflank the Americans when they attacked Procter's lines.

Procter was vastly outnumbered. Most of his artillery had been sent ahead to Moraviantown along with the sick and wounded leaving just 451 regulars to face the Americans. Harrison had close to 3,000 men: five regiments of Kentucky militia, Johnson's mounted regiment, 120 regulars from the 27th Infantry and several light artillery pieces.

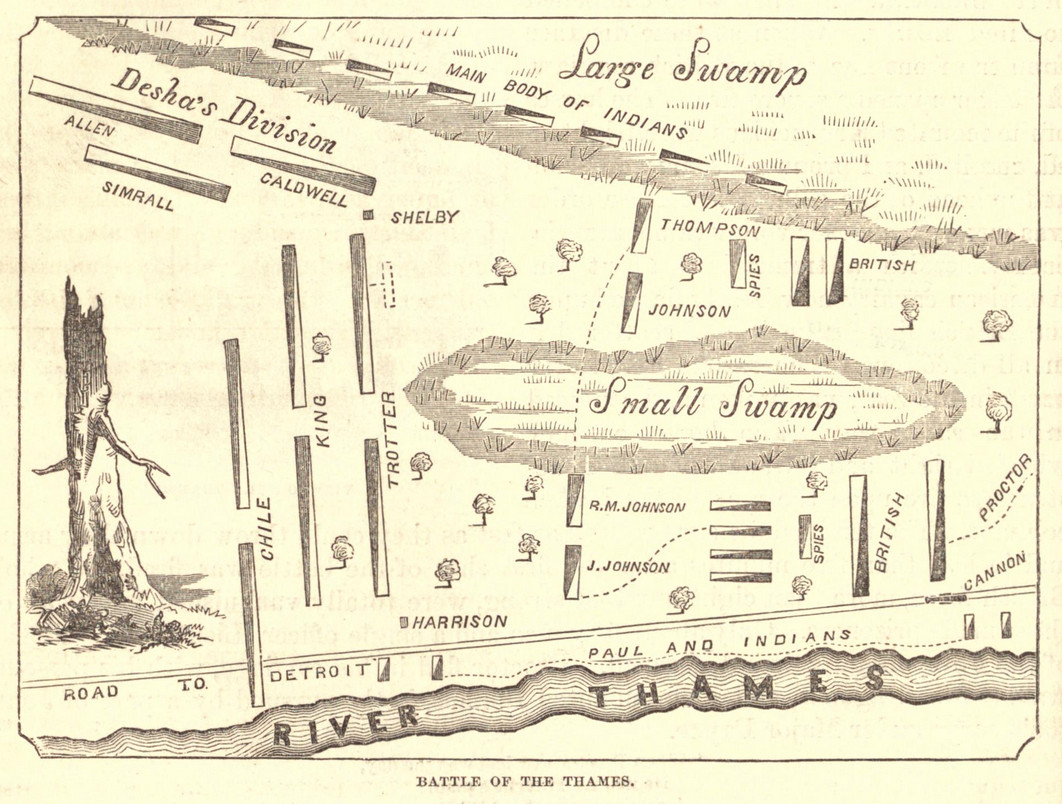
Map of the Battle of the Thames from Lossing's Pictorial Field-Book of the War of 1812 published in 1868

Harrison arranged his forces so that while his right faced the British, the soldiers on his left faced the direction from which an Indigenous attack was likely to occur. After examining the ground, Harrison decided that instead of a bayonet charge with infantry, the mounted troops under Lieutenant Colonel James Johnson would attack the British left while troops led by Colonel Richard Johnson would cross the small swampy area that bisected the British line and then move against the Indigenous warriors concealed in the Backmetack Marsh.

James Johnson's riders charged forward shouting "Remember the Raisin!" The British fired a ragged volley, however, the artillery piece failed to fire. The Americans hit the British line and forced it to give way. Johnson led his men through the second line then swung around to attack the British right from the rear. The ferocity of the attack caused most of the British to surrender. Meanwhile Richard Johnson emerged from the small swamp and came under heavy fire from Tecumseh's followers. Harrison ordered his left flank to advance in support. After an intense fight in which Tecumseh was killed and Richard Johnson seriously wounded, the warriors retreated deeper into the marsh.

It is estimated that as many as 18 British soldiers were killed and 36 wounded. In his report, Harrison stated that his men had taken just over 600 prisoners including those captured earlier in the day. He claimed that 12 of his own men were killed or fatally wounded and another 17 were injured. Indigenous fatalities numbered 16 including Tecumseh although Harrison claimed twice that number. Roughly 50 British soldiers escaped the battlefield including Procter, however, the carriage with his baggage and papers, including letters from his wife, was captured. Most of those who had been at Moraviantown or further upriver during the battle also escaped capture.

Procter later stated that he had tried to rally his troops before he galloped off himself. He admitted that the conduct of the 41st Foot "was not upon this unfortunate occasion, such as I have on every other witnessed with pride and satisfaction." Procter regrouped at the Grand River then proceeded to Ancaster. Two days later the remnants of Procter's force, a total of 246 officers and men, were merged with the army of Major General John Vincent at Burlington.

== Aftermath ==
Lieutenant General Sir George Prevost, the Governor General of the Canadas, condemned Procter's actions during the retreat. In his report to Lord Bathurst, the Secretary of State for War and Colonies, Prevost held Procter responsible not only for the defeat at the Battle of the Thames, but also Barclay's defeat at the Battle of Lake Erie. Bathurst ordered that a court martial be held, however, the trial was delayed as many of the officers who would be called to testify were still prisoners of war. A court martial finally was convened at Quebec on 21 December 1814 and sat until 28 January 1815. Procter, despite a spirited defence, was found to have been "erroneous in judgement and deficient in energy." He was sentenced to be publicly reprimanded, and was suspended from his rank and pay for six months. The Prince Regent later reduced the sentence to a reprimand but ordered that the findings and sentence be read to every regiment in the Army. The conviction ended Procter's military career.

== Legacy ==
In their December 1813 report titled Barbarities of the Enemy, a committee of the United States House of Representatives held Procter directly responsible for the murders of wounded prisoners after the Battle of Frenchtown. Excerpts from the report were widely published in American newspapers and frequently embellished including a claim that Harrison's men had discovered an officer's quarters at Amherstburg "festooned with scalps."

19th century American histories such as Benson Lossing's 1868 Pictorial History of the War of 1812 vilified Procter as a "inhuman officer" who directed or permitted the murder of American prisoners. In his Second War with England, Joel Headley claimed that Procter "gave unbridled license" to his Indigenous allies, who "were allowed to scalp and mutilate the dead and wounded, whose bleeding corpses crimsoned the snow on every side." These claims reflect the false belief that Britain's Indigenous allies were under the direct control of British officers who were more than willing to encourage or at least accept barbarity. The conviction of Proctor's culpability continues to colour more modern work such as Donald Hickey's 2012 The War of 1812: A Forgotten Conflict.

Canadian histories tended to focus on Procter's failings as a military leader rather than his alleged role in atrocities. Writing in 1899, noted historian Ernest Cruikshank declared Procter guilty of "indecision and unpardonable negligence." A century later, military historian J. Mackay Hitsman wrote that of all the British generals "only Procter managed to blunder consistently."

Most Canadian accounts of Procter's actions during the War of 1812 cite the work of John Richardson. Richardson was a gentleman volunteer with the 41st Regiment, and was with Procter at the Battle of Frenchtown and the Siege of Fort Meigs before being captured at the Battle of the Thames. Richardson published his account in 1842 but his work received little attention until it was reprinted in 1902 as Richardson's War of 1812. Richardson was highly critical of Procter since he believed that Procter had failed to adequately recognize his services at the Siege of Fort Meigs. Richardson stated that at the Battle of Moraviantown, Procter "sought safety in flight at the very commencement of the action," claimed that Procter chose the position in order to cover the departure of his family and personal effects from Moraviantown, and declared the general's defence at his court-martial "specious."

More recent work has attempted to rehabilitate Procter's tainted reputation. Noted Canadian writer and journalist Pierre Berton magnanimously wrote:

To the Americans he remains a monster, to the Canadians a coward. He is neither—merely a victim of circumstances, a brave officer but weak, capable enough except in moments of stress, a man of modest pretensions....The prisoner of events beyond his control, Procter dallied and equivocated until he was crushed. His career is ended.

Historical writer Sandy Antal reassessed Procter's career in Wampum Denied: Procter's War of 1812. Antal highlights Procter's successes, noting that the accusations made at Procter's court martial overshadowed his contributions prior to the Battle of Lake Erie. Procter convinced the reluctant Wyandot to support the British, disrupted Hull's supply line, defeated Winchester at the Battle of Frenchtown, and maintained the alliance with Tecumseh and other Indigenous leaders. Antal stressed that Procter struggled with an extended supply line that depended upon the free passage of vessels on Lake Erie, and was "badly served" by superiors who repeatedly failed to provide the soldiers, sailors, and supplies needed to adequately defend the Western District. In a later article, Antal noted that by October 1813, "Procter and his soldiers were both worn out by extended deprivations, leaving the outcome at Moraviantown predictable."

== Personal life ==
Procter married Elizabeth Cockburn in Kilkenny, Ireland in 1792. They had one son and four daughters. The three oldest were born in England while their daughter, Frances Sarah, was born at Quebec in 1803. Their youngest daughter, Augusta Margaret, was born at Niagara in 1808. Elizabeth and the children joined Procter at Amherstburg in September 1812. When the British retreated from Amherstburg a year later, Procter's family were billeted at Moraviantown on 29 September but departed by boat for the village of Delaware on 5 October several hours before the Battle of the Thames.

Procter's son Henry joined the 41st Regiment in 1812 as a gentleman volunteer. The following year he was commissioned an ensign in the 8th Regiment of Foot, and obtained a Lieutenancy in 1816.

Procter and his family returned to England in 1815. No longer on the Army List, he collaborated with his nephew George Procter and wrote an account of his war experiences that was highly critical of Prevost. Procter's article was published in the Quarterly Review shortly before his death in Bath, Somerset in 1822.

== Sources ==
- Antal, Sandy (1997). A Wampum Denied: Procter's War of 1812. Ottawa: Carleton University Press. ISBN 0886293189.
- Antal, Sandy (2007). "The Western Theatre in the War of 1812". The Napoleon Series: The War of 1812 Magazine. The Waterloo Association.
- Antal, Sandy (2008). "Remember the Raisin! Anatomy of a Demon Myth". The Napoleon Series: The War of 1812 Magazine. The Waterloo Association.
- Antal, Sandy (2016). "Tecumseh: Fact or Fiction" (PDF). The Napoleon Series: The War of 1812 Magazine. The Waterloo Association.
- Ashdown, Dana William (2014). "The Thames River Wrecks: A Paper Exploring the Lost Vessels of Major-General Henry Procter's Retreat up the Thames River in the Western District of Upper Canada" (PDF). The Napoleon Series: The War of 1812 Magazine. The Waterloo Association.
- Berton, Pierre (1981). Flames Across the Border: 1813–1814. Toronto: McClellan & Stewart.
- Casselman, Alexander Clark (1902). Richardson's War of 1812: With Notes and a Life of the Author. Toronto: Historical Publishing Company.
- Cruikshank, Ernest (1899). "The Contest for the Command of Lake Erie in 1812–1813". Transactions of the Canadian Institute. 6: 359–386.
- Cruikshank, Ernest A. (1912). Documents Relating to the Invasion of Canada and the Surrender of Detroit, 1812. Ottawa: Government Printing Bureau.
- Headley, J. T (1853). The Second War with England. Vol. 1. New York: Charles Scribner.
- Hickey, Donald R. (2012). The War of 1812: A Forgotten Conflict, Bicentennial Edition. Urbana, Illinois: University of Illinois Press. ISBN 978-0252078378.
- Hitsman, J. Mackay; Graves, Donald E. (1999). The Incredible War of 1812. Robin Brass Studio. ISBN 978-1896941134.
- Horwitz, Tony (2012). "The War of 1812's Forgotten Battle Cry". Smithsonian Magazine.
- House of Representatives of the United States (1814). Barbarities of the Enemy Exposed in a Report of the Committee of the House of Representatives. Worcester, Massachusetts.
- Hyatt, A. M. J. (1987). "Procter (Proctor), Henry". Dictionary of Canadian Biography. University of Toronto/Université Laval.
- Lossing, Benson (1868). The Pictorial Field-Book of the War of 1812. New York: Harper and Brothers.
- National Park Service (2023). "A National Calamity: How the Horrors at the River Raisin Became a Rallying Cry". American Battlefield Trust.
- Nelson (2006). "Dudley's Defeat and the Relief of Fort Meigs during the War of 1812". The Register of the Kentucky Historical Society. 104 (1): 5–42.
- Skaggs, David Curtis; Altoff, Gerard T. (1997). A Signal Victory: The Lake Erie Campaign, 1812-1813. Annapolis, Maryland: Naval Institute Press. ISBN 978-1557500304.
- Sugden, John (1985). Tecumseh's Last Stand. Norman, Oklahoma: University of Oklahoma Press. ISBN 0806119446.
- Sugden, John (1998). Tecumseh: A Life. New York: Henry Holt & Co. ISBN 978-0805041385.
- Turner, Wesley B. (2011). The Astonishing General: The Life and Legacy of Sir Isaac Brock. Toronto: Dundurn. ISBN 978-1-55488-777-4.
