= Western District, Upper Canada =

Western District
- Former District in Upper Canada
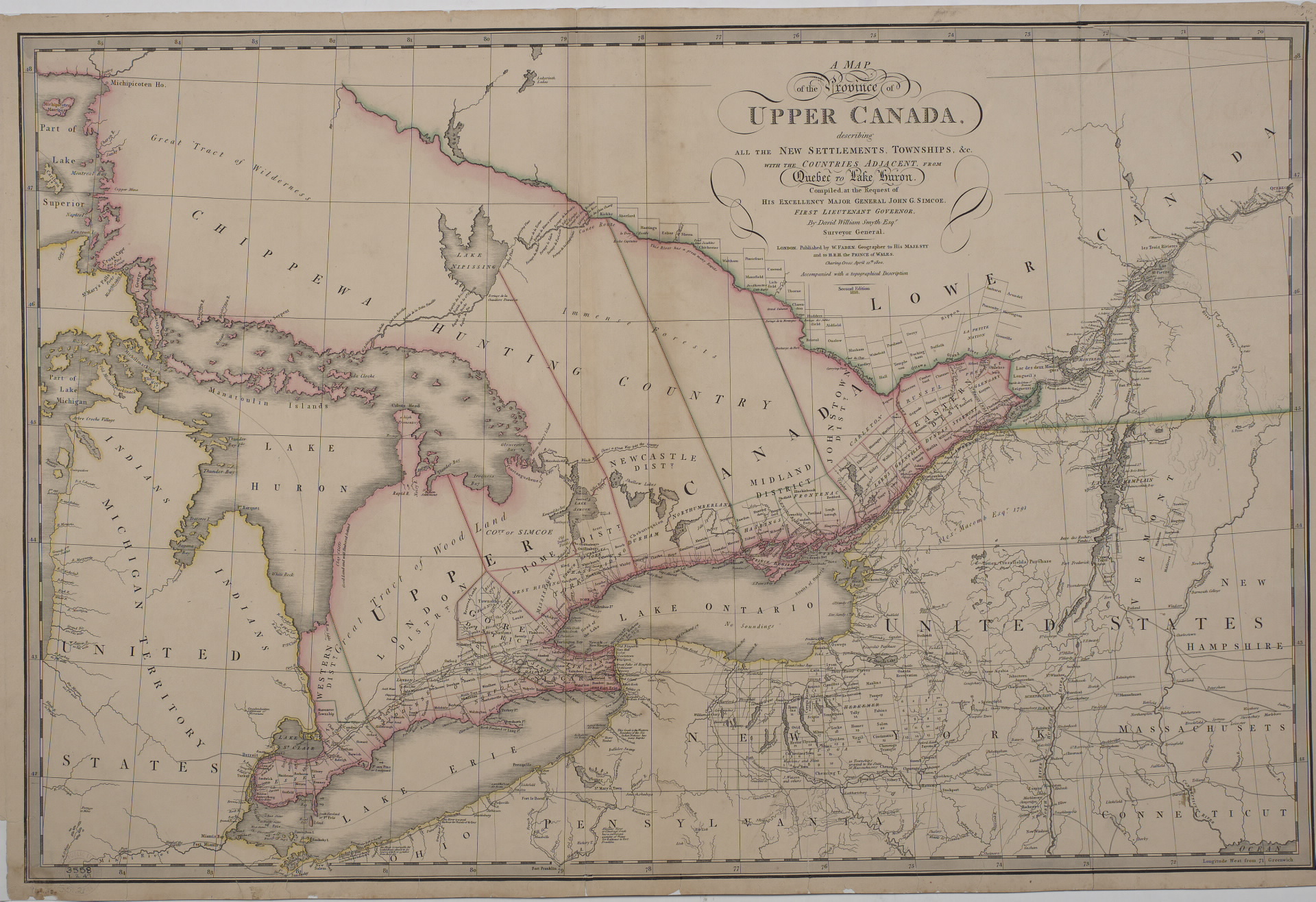
- Map of Upper Canada Identifying its districts, counties and townships (1818)
- Interactive map of Western District
- Coordinates: 42°28′N 82°11′W
- Established: 1788
- Dissolved: 1849

Western District was one of four districts of the Province of Quebec created in 1788 in the western reaches of the Montreal District which were later detached in 1791 to create the new colony of Upper Canada. Known as Hesse District (named after Hesse in Germany) until 1792, it was abolished in 1849.

== Historical evolution ==
The District originally consisted of that part of the Province of Quebec west of "a north and south line, intersecting the extreme projection of Long Point into the lake Erie," being the territory described as:

... comprehend[ing] all the residue of our said province in the western and inland parts thereof, of the entire breadth thereof, from the southerly to the northerly border of the same... (Note: that is to say, from the Canada–United States border to the northern boundary with Rupert's Land)

As Detroit was still occupied British territory in 1792, it formed part of the District at the time. In the first election to the Legislative Assembly of Upper Canada, three former or current residents of Detroit were elected. This anomaly, together with other occupied places at Fort Mackinac and Fort Miami, were finally vacated upon the ratification of the Jay Treaty in 1795; they were withdrawn from the District in June 1796.

The District, after detaching territory that would be part of the new London District, was reconstituted as the Western District by an Act of the Parliament of Upper Canada in 1798. It was described as consisting of "...the Counties of Essex and Kent together with so much of this Province as is not included within any other district thereof..." The counties were described as consisting of the following:

Counties of the Western District (1798)
County of Kent	County of Essex
The townships of: Dover; Chatham; Camden (distinguished by being called Camden West); the Moravian tract of land, (Note: originally granted to what is now the Delaware Nation at Moraviantown) called Orford (distinguished by Orford North and South); Howard; Harwich; Raleigh; Romney; Tilbury (divided into east and west); with the township on the River Sinclair, occupied by the Shawney Indians, (Note: later surveyed as Sombra township) together with the islands in the lakes Erie and Sinclair wholly or in greater part opposite thereto...	The townships of: Rochester; Mersea; Gosfield; Maidstone; Sandwich; Colchester; Malden; and the tracts of land occupied by the Huron and other Indians upon the Strait, (Note: being the mouth of the St. Clair River) together with such of the islands as are in lakes Erie, Sinclair, or the Straits... (Note: being the Detroit River and the mouth of the St. Clair River)

In 1847, legislation was initiated to create a new Kent District; however, facilities at the designated district town of Chatham needed to be built. The creation of the new district was not completed.

At the beginning of 1850, the District was abolished, being replaced by the United Counties of Essex and Kent for municipal purposes. In 1851, the southern part of Kent was detached to for a separate county, with the northern part becoming Lambton County, which was united with Essex to become the United Counties of Essex and Lambton. However, Kent and Lambton were united for the purpose of electing a member to the Parliament of the Province of Canada. The former District's townships were accordingly distributed as follows:

Distribution of the townships of the former Western District (1851)
United Counties of Essex and Lambton		Kent County
Essex County	Lambton County	Kent County
Mersea; Gosfield; Colchester; Rochester; Maidstone; Malden; Anderdon; Tilbury West; Sandwich	Bosanquet; Plympton; Warwick; Sarnia; Moore; Enniskillen; Brooke; Sombra; Dawn; Euphemia; including Walpole Islands, St. Ann's Island, and the other islands at the mouth of the River St. Clair (Note: now constituting the Walpole Island First Nation)	Orford; Howard; Camden; Chatham; Harwich; Dover East; Dover West; Raleigh; Tilbury East; Romney; Zone

== Legacy ==
Western District Grammar School, founded 1807, is now occupied by General Brock Public School in Windsor, Ontario.
