= Capture of HMS Caledonia and HMS Detroit =

Military action during the War of 1812

- Part of War of 1812
Date	October 9, 1812
Location	Fort Erie, Ontario
Result	American victory

Belligerents
United Kingdom	United States

Commanders and leaders
Frédérick Rolette (POW)	Jesse D. Elliott

Strength
66; 2 brigs	100

Casualties and losses
2 killed 5 wounded 64 captured 1 brig captured 1 brig destroyed	6 killed 9 wounded

The capture of HMS Caledonia and HMS Detroit was an action which took place during the War of 1812. On October 9, 1812, 100 American sailors and soldiers crossed the Niagara River to capture two British vessels anchored near Fort Erie. The Americans stormed the decks and successfully captured the ships and their cargo.

== Background ==
On the night of October 9, 1812, the British ships HMS Detroit and HMS Caledonia, were anchored off Fort Erie in the Niagara River. Detroit had been captured by the British during the Siege of Detroit in August. The ships had been doing supply runs between Niagara and the British Fort Amherstburg. Lieutenant Jessie Elliot had only recently arrived at Buffalo and almost immediately started gathering troops for a raid on the ships.

== Action ==
Elliots' force departed the Black Rock, Buffalo Navy Yard at midnight in two boats, one commanded by Elliot himself and the other by Captain Towson. When Towson's boat approached Caledonia the British crew noticed them and opened fire. The Americans threw grapnels over the deck of the ship. Only one held but it was enough. Within two minutes of the American boarding, the crew of the brig surrendered. The British sailors on Detroit were distracted by the action on the Caledonia, allowing Elliot's men to easily take the brig by surprise. The Americans tried to bring the brigs to the American shore but soon went aground. British artillery from Fort Erie fired at the brigs with little effect. American artillery from Black Rock then began bombarding Fort Erie and Elliot moved all of the Detroit's guns to the side of the ship to fire at Fort Erie. Calendonia meanwhile ran aground on the American side of the river. Detroit ran aground on Squaw Island. Smaller American boats brought the American sailors and British prisoners ashore. Soon after, a British force of 40 headed by boat to the beached Detroit. They briefly regained control of the brig but cannon fire from Black Rock drove them away. The Americans determined that the cannon fire had wrecked Detroit beyond saving. A small American party burned the brig to prevent it from falling into British hands.

== Aftermath ==
Issac Brock arrived at Fort Erie with a much larger force than the Americans had across the shore. He wanted to cross the river but George Prevost had given him orders not to conduct offensive actions. Aboard the Detroit 52 British sailors were taken captive and another 32 American prisoners on the ship were released. On Caledonia, 12 British sailors were taken captive and 10 more American prisoners were released. The two ship's cargo included 200 muskets, $200,000 worth of fur, and so much pork destined for Fort Amherstburg that the British there had to go on half rations.

== Sources ==
- Cruikshank, Earnst (1902). The Documentary History of the Campaign Upon the Niagara Frontier in the Year 1813. Welland Ontario: Lundys Lane Historical Society.
- Hannings, Bud (2012). The War of 1812: A Complete Chronology with biographies of 63 General Officers. McFarland and Company Inc. ISBN 9780786463855.
