= HMS Caledonia =

Five ships and three shore establishments of the Royal Navy have borne the name HMS Caledonia after the Latin name for Scotland:

== Ships ==
- HMS Caledonia (1807) was a 3-gun brig launched in 1807. She was captured by the Americans in 1812, and put into service as USS Caledonia (1812).
- HMS Caledonia (1808) was a 120-gun first rate ship of the line launched in 1808. She became a hospital ship and was renamed HMS Dreadnought in 1856 and was broken up in 1875.
- HMS Caledonia (1862) was a Prince Consort-class broadside ironclad launched in 1862 and sold in 1886.
- HMS Caledonia was a training ship launched in 1810 as the 98-gun second rate HMS Impregnable (1810). She became a training ship in 1862, was renamed HMS Kent in 1888, HMS Caledonia in 1891, and was sold for breaking up in 1906.
- HMS Caledonia was a cadet training ship, formerly the liner RMS Majestic (1914). She was transferred to the navy in 1936 and commissioned in 1937. She was burnt by accident in 1939. The wreck was raised and scrapped in 1943.

In 1911, the name HMS Caledonia was proposed for the battleship HMS New Zealand (1904), which needed to be renamed to free the name New Zealand for use by a new battlecruiser, but the battleship was instead renamed HMS Zealandia.

== Shore establishments ==
- HMS Caledonia (1943 shore establishment) was the navy base at Oban, commissioned in 1943 and paid off in 1945.
- HMS Caledonia (1946 shore establishment) was an artificers' training establishment commissioned in 1946 and paid off in 1985.
- HMS Caledonia (1996 shore establishment) is a support base commissioned in 1996 at Rosyth, Fife, Scotland.
