= Frédérick Rolette =

Royal Navy officer

- Born: 23 September 1785; Quebec City, Quebec
- Died: 17 March 1831 (aged 45); Quebec City, Lower Canada
- Military career
- Allegiance: United Kingdom
- Branch: Royal Navy; Provincial Marine
- Service years: c. 1798–1815
- Rank: Lieutenant
- Commands: HMS General Hunter; HMS Detroit; HMS Lady Prevost
- Conflicts: War of 1812: Capture of Cuyahoga Packet; Siege of Detroit; Capture of HMS Caledonia and HMS Detroit (POW); Battle of Frenchtown (WIA); Battle of Lake Erie (POW)

Frédérick Rolette (23 September 1785 to 17 March 1831), born in Quebec City on 23 September 1785, was an officer of the Royal Navy who served in the Provincial Marine during the War of 1812. In command of the brig General Hunter at the outset of the conflict, his interception of the packet ship Cuyahoga Packet in July 1812 captured the papers of the American commanding officer William Hull which proved a windfall for British forces and eventually led to the fall of Detroit under Hull's command. However, he was captured after his ship was boarded and taken over by the Americans. He returned to British service after a prisoner swap and participated in the Battle of Frenchtown in 1813 as part of a naval artillery contingent. Serving as the second-in-command of the British schooner Lady Prevost at the Battle of Lake Erie, he took over captaincy of the vessel after the commanding officer was mortally wounded. Rolette was also significantly injured in the battle and was forced to surrender. He spent the rest of the war in captivity.

The canton of Rolette, Quebec, is named for him, as well as HMCS Frédérick Rolette, a Harry DeWolf-class offshore patrol vessel of the Royal Canadian Navy.

== Biography ==
Frédérick Rolette (spelled "Frédéric" in his birth records) was born in Quebec City, Province of Quebec, and entered the Royal Navy at a young age. Some secondary accounts have him serving (and being wounded) at the Battle of the Nile in 1798 and also serving at the Battle of Trafalgar in 1805. However, he is not listed among officers wounded at the Nile nor among British participants at Trafalgar. Whatever his role in the Royal Navy, he is said to have returned to Canada and to have taken a commission as a second lieutenant in the Provincial Marine in October 1807.

Just before the outbreak of the War of 1812, Rolette was posted to Amherstburg, Upper Canada, now as first lieutenant in command of the 10-gun brig General Hunter. When word of the outbreak of war reached Amherstburg in early July 1812, Rolette captured the American vessel Cuyahoga Packet, before the crew of that ship was aware that war had been declared. As reported by Thomas Vercheres de Boucherville, Rolette seized the vessel by leading some two-dozen sailors and Indians in a long boat and canoes who boarded the ship without meeting any resistance. The capture of the ship meant that the papers of General William Hull, the commanding officer leading the American invasion of Canada across the Detroit River, fell into British hands.

Rolette then served at the subsequent capture of Fort Detroit in August 1812, where the entire American invasion force was compelled to surrender. Of his service, the British commander, Major-General Isaac Brock, is reported to have commented that: "I have watched you during the action ... you behaved like a lion and I will remember you." Rolette was in command of the brig Detroit in October 1812 when he and his ship (along with the brig Caledonia) were captured by the Americans in a surprise raid in which the defenders were heavily outnumbered. Despite the capture of his ship, Brock again referred to him as a having had "the character of a brave attentive officer". Quickly exchanged as a prisoner, he then commanded a naval gun contingent on land during the Battle of Frenchtown in January 1813, where, although suffering a head wound, he refused to leave the field. As commanding officer of General Hunter in 1812–1813, he captured more than a dozen prizes.

Rolette served as second-in-command of British schooner Lady Prevost at the Battle of Lake Erie on 10 September 1813. When the captain, Lieutenant James Buchan, was mortally wounded, he assumed command until he himself was severely wounded as the result of an explosion. He was forced to surrender his ship and again became a prisoner of war, this time for the remainder of the conflict. Rolette returned to Quebec City at the conclusion of the war and was presented a fifty-guinea sword of honour by its citizens. He died on 17 March 1831, never having fully recovered from his many wounds.

== Legacy ==
The Canton of Rolette, Quebec, located on the south shore of the St. Lawrence River, was established in 1868 in his honour.

HMCS Frédérick Rolette, an Arctic offshore patrol ship of the Royal Canadian Navy that started construction in May 2021 and was delivered in 2024, is named in his honour.
