= HMS General Hunter =

1807 schooner and brig

History

United Kingdom
- Name: HMS General Hunter
- Ordered: 1806
- Builder: Amherstburg Royal Naval Dockyard, Upper Canada
- Laid down: 1806
- Launched: 1807
- Captured: By U.S. Navy 10 September 1813

United States
- Name: U.S. Army Transport Hunter
- Acquired: 10 September 1813
- Fate: Forced ashore in a violent gale on 19 August 1816
- Notes: Hull still buried under the sand of Southampton beach in Ontario. Fully excavated in 2004 with all artifacts - and ship replica - now on display in the Bruce County Museum and Cultural Centre, Southampton, Ontario

General characteristics as brig
- Type: 10-gun brig
- Tons burthen: 93 tons
- Length: 54 ft (16 m)
- Beam: 18 ft (5 m)
- Draught: 8 ft 6 in (2.6 m)
- Depth of hold: 8 ft (2 m)
- Propulsion: Sail
- Sail plan: Brig-rigged on two masts
- Complement: 28
- Armament: 4 × 6-pounder long guns; 2 × 4-pounder long guns; 2 × 2-pounder long guns; 2 × 12-pounder carronades

HMS General Hunter was a 10-gun brig of the Upper Canada Provincial Marine then, in 1813, the Royal Navy for their squadron on Lake Erie. She was ordered and built as a schooner in 1806 to replace Hope, a Provincial Marine vessel that had run aground in 1805. General Hunter was launched in 1807, entering service that year. With the outbreak of the War of 1812, General Hunter was converted to a brig and rearmed. As part of the Lake Erie squadron, General Hunter was present at the Battle of Lake Erie where the United States Navy defeated the British and gained control of the lake. General Hunter was captured at the battle and taken into American service. With the ship's name shortened to Hunter, she was used as a transport for the rest of the war. Following the war, the ship was sold into mercantile service. In 1816, the ship ran aground in a storm on Lake Huron and wrecked. The ship's contents were salvaged, but the wreck was left to be buried under the sand. In 2004, the wreck became the site of archaeological excavations and artifacts were retrieved from the site and placed in museums.

== Description and construction ==
In 1805, the Upper Canada Provincial Marine schooner Hope was run aground and wrecked. To replace Hope, a new schooner was ordered to exactly the same design in 1806. The vessel was constructed at Amherstburg Royal Naval Dockyard in Amherstburg, Upper Canada. General Hunter was launched in 1807. The ship had a displacement of 93 tons burthen and was 54 feet (16 m) long at the keel, with a beam of 18 feet (5 m) and a draught of 8 feet 6 inches (3 m). The ship had a depth of hold of 8 feet (2 m).

== Service history ==
After launching, General Hunter lacked armament. Eight carronades were allocated to be used to arm General Hunter and fellow Provincial Marine vessel Earl of Camden. During her first six years she served on the Upper Great Lakes as a Provincial Marine patrol and transport vessel. In 1810, General Hunter and Earl of Camden were sent to Pelee Island to transport cedar timber for the construction of Queen Charlotte at Amherstburg. With the launch of Queen Charlotte in 1810, Earl of Camden was discarded and General Hunter became the only Provincial Marine vessel capable of operating on Lake Huron. However, by December 1811, the Provincial Marine had left the vessel's condition deteriorate enough that General Hunter was identified as a candidate for replacement should war break out.

After the War of 1812 began, General Hunter was under the command of Lieutenant Frédérick Rolette when it captured the schooner Cuyahoga Packet with part of General Hull's baggage aboard, including the disposition of American forces. General Hunter approached Cuyahoga Packet on 3 July 1812, which was transporting 40 soldiers. Rolette, with six to seven of his crew, entered a longboat, rowed to the American vessel which had not heard of the declaration of war, and seized the ship at gunpoint by surprise. This was the first significant act of the war. General Hunter, alongside Queen Charlotte supported the attack and capture of Detroit on 16 August, firing on the American defensive installations.

In 1813, General Hunter was converted to a brig, and received two 6-pounder, four 4-pounder and two 2-pounder long guns and two 12-pounder carronades, for a total 10 guns. Commander Robert Heriot Barclay arrived at Amherstburg to take command of the squadron on Lake Erie in June 1813 and reviewed his group of vessels. He stated that General Hunter was a "miserably small thing". At the time, the vessel's company of 30 was mostly made up of soldiers from the army.

=== Battle of Lake Erie ===
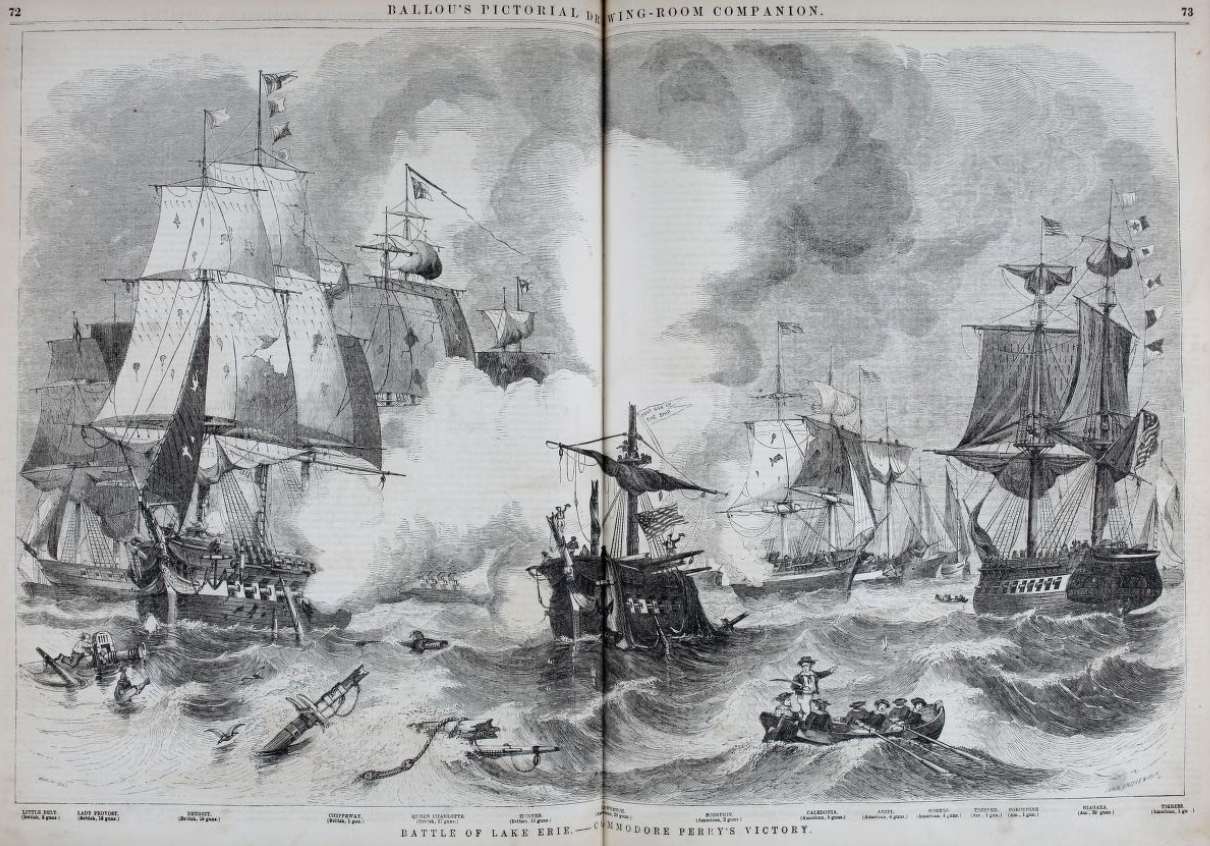
Battle of Lake Erie, Ballou's Pictorial 1856

At the time of Barclay's arrival, the Americans were constructing larger, more powerful ships at Erie in a bid to wrest control of the lake. Barclay intended to raid Erie and burn the new construction before the vessels could enter service, but was prevented from enacting the plan by the Army, which refused to give him the troops he needed. Barclay instead set up a blockade of Erie, intending to interdict the ships if they launched. Barclay put this plan in motion three days after arriving at Amherstburg. On 30 July 1813, Barclay's squadron lifted the blockade in order to resupply at Amherstburg. During his absence, the American commander Oliver Hazard Perry launched the ships. Upon his return, Barclay saw the powerful American ships on the lake and the squadron retreated to Amherstburg to await the launch of Detroit.

At the end of July, Perry began his own blockade, preventing the water transport of supplies between Long Point and Amherstburg. This caused shortages in basic provisions among the British, and also prevented the armament of Detroit from arriving. After Detroit was completed, Barclay was forced to shift guns from among his active vessels in order to arm the ship. On 9 September 1813, with Detroit added to the squadron, Barclay sailed from his anchorage in the Detroit River to break the blockade.

With a crew of 45, General Hunter was situated third in Barclay's line of battle, behind Detroit and in front of Queen Charlotte. The vessel, now under Royal Navy command and captained by Lieutenant George Bignell, took part in the Battle of Lake Erie on 10 September. During the battle, USS Caledonia pounded General Hunter with more powerful armament, to which the British vessel was inadequately unable to reply to. After USS Lawrence was disabled and Perry shifted his command to USS Niagara, the four trailing American schooners closed with General Hunter and Queen Charlotte and engaged them. Once both Detroit and Queen Charlotte struck their colours, General Hunter and the other smaller ships of the squadron surrendered.

After the war, General Hunter was sold to a private owner in the United States, then was soon purchased by the United States Army to become a supply vessel serving on the upper Great Lakes and the ship's name shortened to Hunter. In August 1816, while sailing from Michilimakinac at the northern end of Lake Huron to Detroit, Hunter was caught in a violent gale, and the crew were forced to beach the ship on the Canadian side of the lake at what is now Southampton, Ontario. The ship master, seven crew members and two young passengers were all able to get safely ashore.

== Wreck site and preservation ==
The shipwreck site was later quietly salvaged by United States Army vessels which had been dispatched to the site. Following the salvaging, the hull remains were burned and abandoned and soon were buried under the sand. Several ship frames pushed up through the sand of Southampton Beach in 2001 and a series of archaeological excavations revealed the presence of a large part of the hull of General Hunter buried just a metre or two under the beach sand. A full interior excavation of the hull in 2004 provided hundreds of artifacts. The artifacts and a 3/4-size ship deck replica of General Hunter are on display at the Bruce County Museum and Cultural Centre in Southampton, Ontario.
