= Sault Canal Emergency Swing Dam =

Emergency Swing Dam

Coordinates: 46°30′47.74″N 84°21′34.52″W

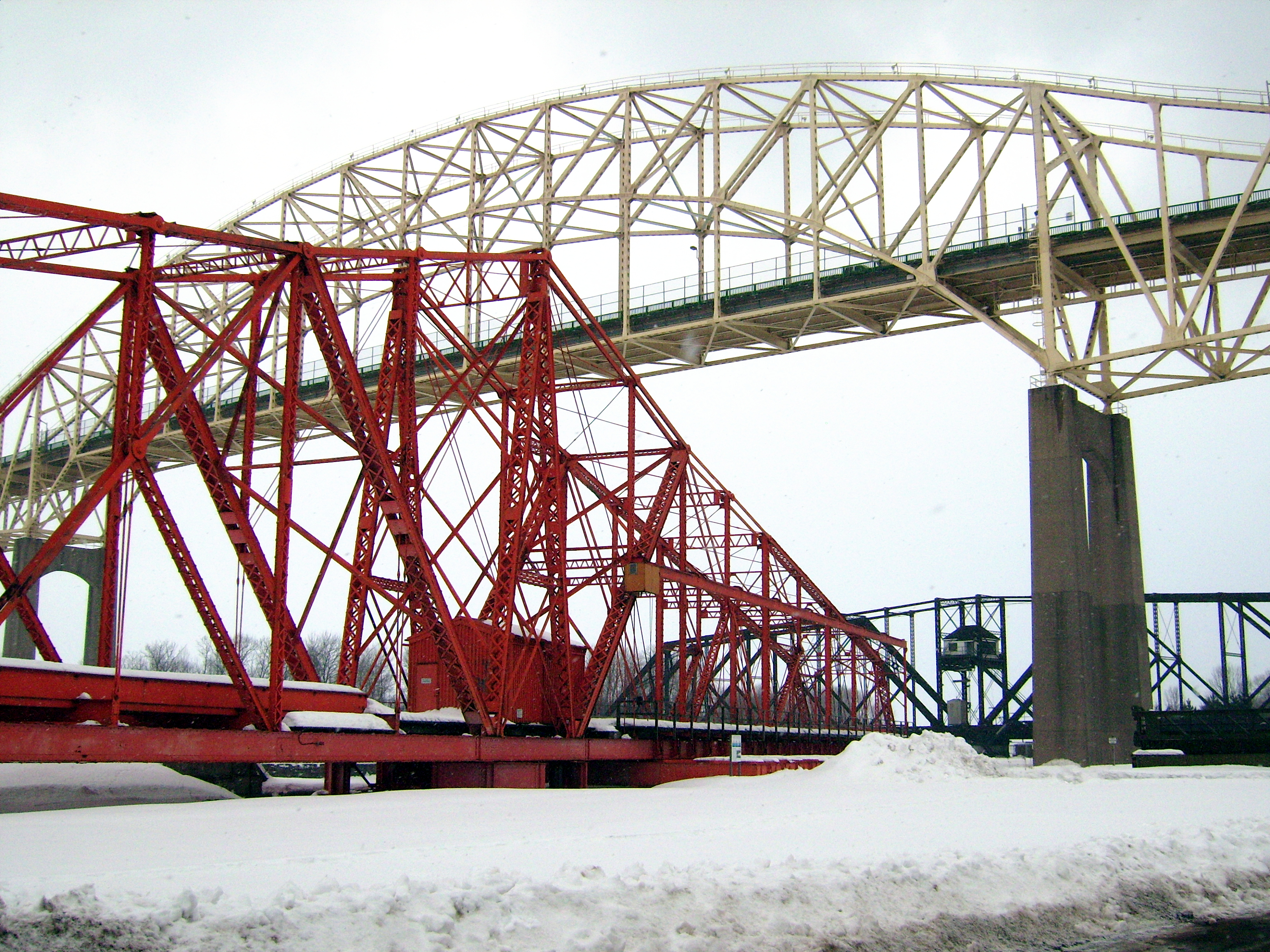
Sault Ste Marie Canal emergency swing dam

The Sault Canal Emergency Swing Dam is an all-metal structure built by the Dominion Bridge Company in 1896. It sits along the Canadian Sault Ste. Marie Canal, to protect against the rush of water that would occur if something ever damaged the Sault locks. It operates by swinging over the canal and dropping wicket gates into the water. The Emergency Dam was put to the ultimate test on June 9, 1909, when the freighter Perry G. Walker crashed into the upstream lock sending a torrent of water crashing into the downstream lock. The Perry G. Walker and another ship the "Assiniboia" were sent back into the St. Marys River and another ship that was heading upstream out of the locks the "Crescent City" hit the channel wall. The swing dam proved its worth by slowing down the torrent of water.

This example of emergency swing bridge is the last of nine ever built. Other examples were previous in Sault Ste. Marie, Michigan, USA and in the Panama Canal.
