= Sault Ste. Marie Museum =

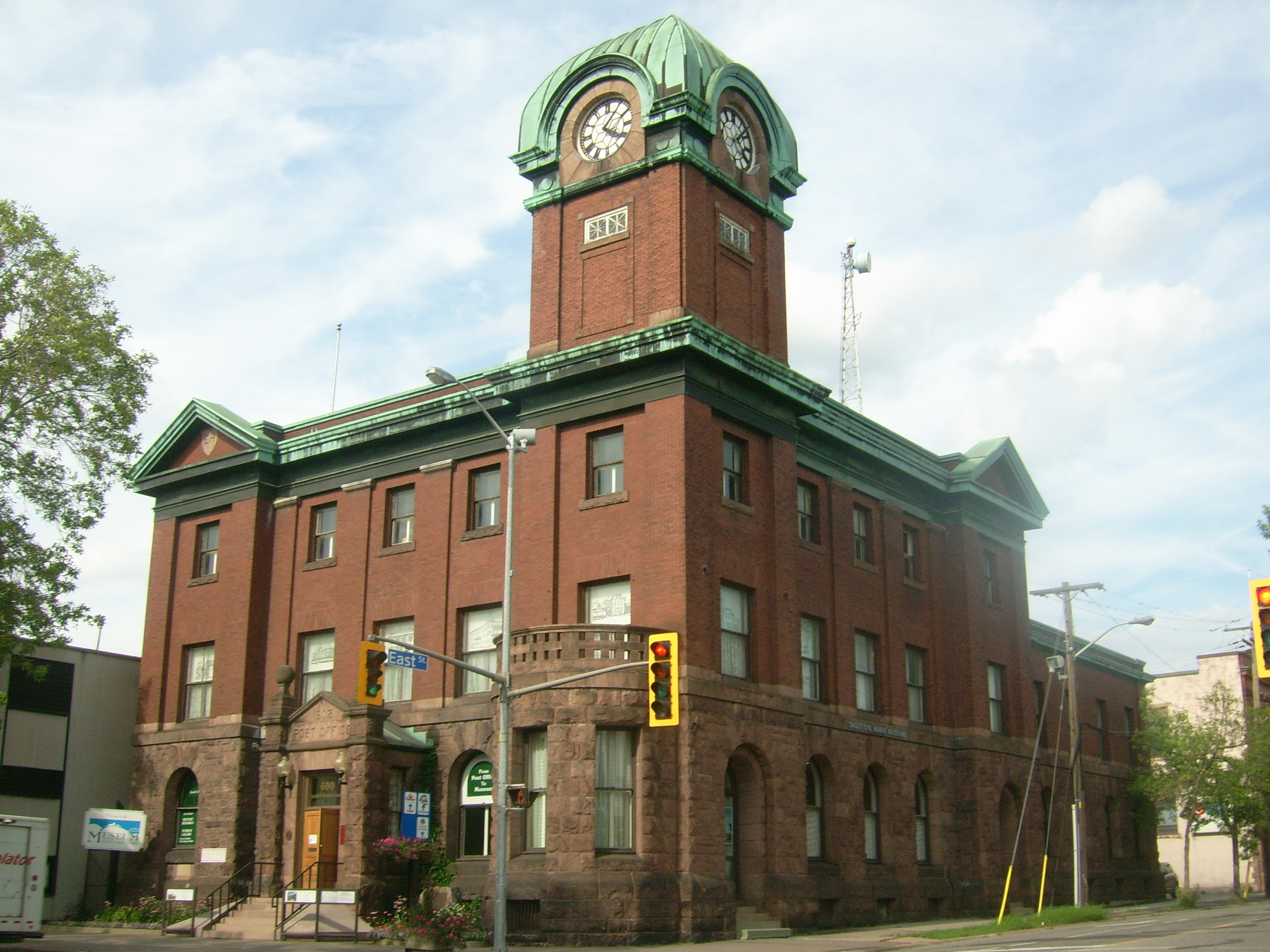
- Established: 1982
- Location: 690 Queen St. E
- Coordinates: 46°30′29″N 84°19′40″W
- Director: Will Hollingshead
- Owner: City of Sault Ste. Marie

History
- Built: 1902–1906

Site notes
- Architect: David Ewart

Ontario Heritage Act
- Official name: Old Post Office
- Designated: 24 October 1983
- Reference no.: HPON05-0523
- Website: www.saultmuseum.ca

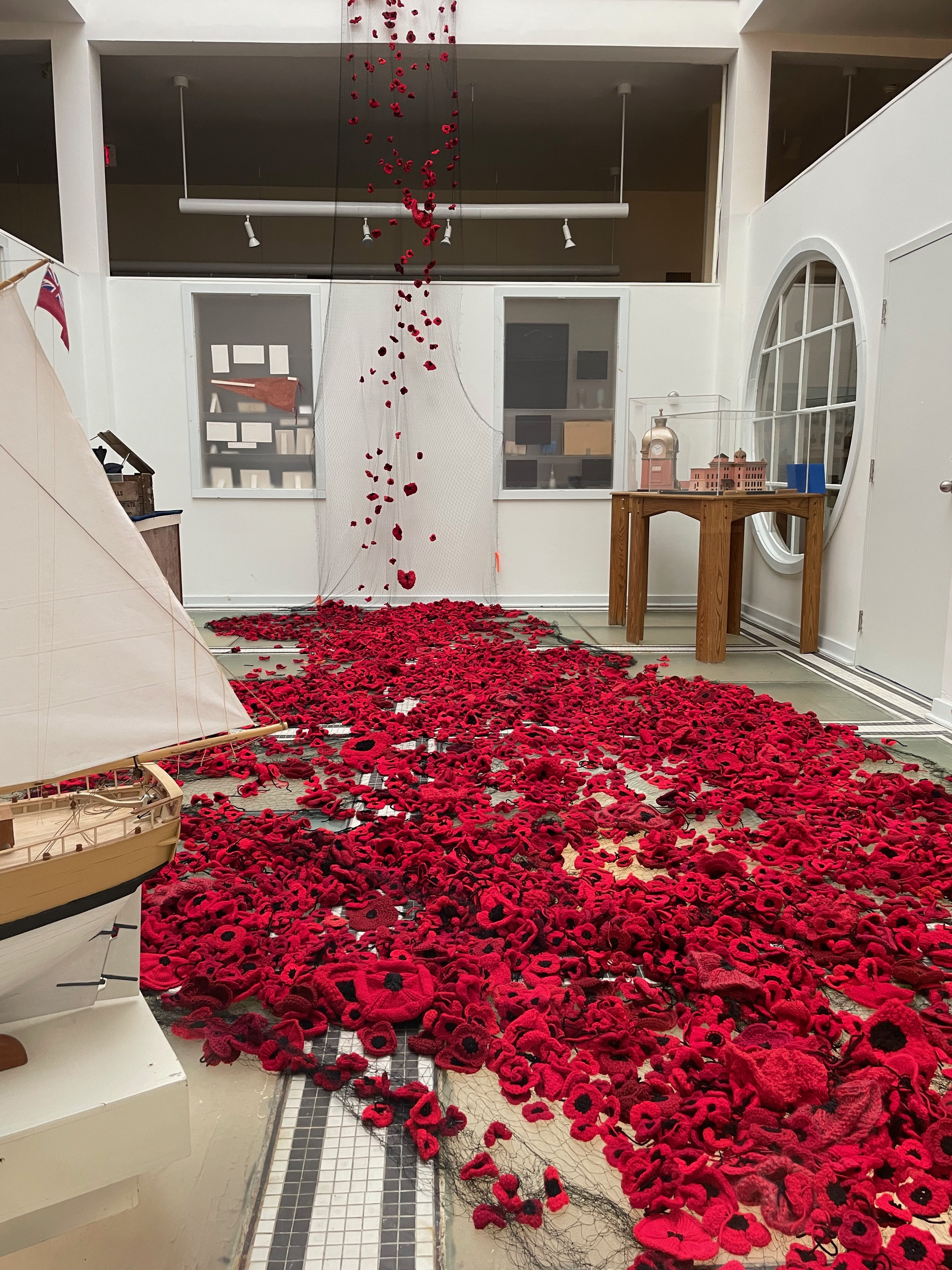
Remembrance Day Crochet Poppy project, 2023

Sault Ste. Marie Museum is a museum in Sault Ste. Marie, Ontario, Canada. Built as a post office from 1902 to 1906, this building became a museum in 1982 when it was purchased by the City of Sault Ste. Marie. It is operated by the Sault Ste. Marie & 49th Field Regiment R.C.A. Historical Society.

== History ==
In 1902, the government allocated C$20,000 for the construction of a post office in Sault Ste. Marie. The site was chosen at the corner of Queen and East streets, as it was close to the winter road (likely the Great Northern Road following a similar route as Ontario Highway 17) leading into the city. Construction of the Dominion Building began in 1904, and was completed in 1906. Along with the post office, the building also housed a customs and excise warehouse, the fisheries officer, and the Indian agent, with an apartment for the caretaker on the third floor. It remained the main post office until 1949 (when Canada Post relocated to 451 Queen Street East and remain in use by the Government of Canada until the 1970s.

The Sault Ste. Marie Historical Society was incorporated in 1921, with membership in the Ontario Historical Society. In 1951, the Department of Defence authorized a room in the Pine Street Armoury to be used as a library/museum, and the 49th Field Artillery Regiment, RCA Historical Society merged with the Sault Ste. Marie Historical Society. The room was financed by Sir James Dunn, then president of Algoma Steel. In the 1980s, it became apparent that this space was limited, and a larger space was needed. The city purchased the building in 1982, and the Historical Society entered into an agreement with the City of Sault Ste. Marie to occupy the now-vacant post office, and opened its doors in 1983.

The building was officially recognized for its historic value on 23 October 1983 by the City of Sault Ste. Marie, under the Ontario Heritage Act.

The museum introduced its first artist-in-residence in 2021 with Isabelle Michaud, a francophone artist. Their next artist-in-residence was Ray Fox, an Anishinaabe two-spirit visual artist, whose exhibit was titled "Baawitigong: An exploration on Anishinaabe history and personal identity".

For Remembrance Day 2023, the Sault Ste. Marie Museum commissioned the local 2310 Army Cadets, 46 Sea Cadets, 155 Borden Grey Air Cadets and other volunteers for the Crochet Poppy Project, to crochet Remembrance poppies for a display draping through the skylight, and draping out front including about 5,000 crocheted poppies

== Architecture ==
The building was designed by Chief Dominion Architect David Ewart, employing Italianate, Romanesque Revival and Neoclassical features, making it an excellent example of the Eclectic architectural style. The imposing base is constructed of local Jacobsville sandstone, with red brick above and topped with copper cornices. As there was a plentiful supply of Jacobsville sandstone from the recent excavation of the Sault Ste. Marie Canal, it is reported that the sandstone only cost C$75 and a bottle of scotch.

The building features Romanesque arched windows, Italianate decorations, and Victorian Classical cornices, a projecting front entrance, as well as hardwood floors and an oak staircase and trimmings. The sandstone base is built of squared rubble sandstone with alternating long and short blocks. The second and third floors of red brick feature large pilasters. The turret on the south corner extends to the height of the first floor, and is built of rounded stones with three rectangular windows. These windows are double-sashed single-pane curved glass. The bow window is topped with a stone parapet, which originally was a balcony. The interior features a three-storey lightwell and skylight.

The clock tower remained empty until the clock was installed in 1912. The clock was crafted by the Smith of Derby Group of Derby, England, and shipped to Montreal, where it was sent by train to the Sault. When the clock arrived, it was discovered that the clock tower was not high enough to support the fixture, and so had to be increased in height, with the original roof maintained. During renovations in 1993, the clock was refurbished, and its three-day wind mechanism was replaced by a motor.

The tower bell was crafted by John Taylor Bellfounders of Loughborough, England, and was shipped along with the clock. It is a 370 kg (810 lb.) bronze bell with iron strike. It is no longer in use, and is now located at street level for public viewing. The bell was damaged with graffiti in 2023, with city workers damaging the patina during clean-up.

The architecture of the museum was recreated in Lego by a local company called The Brickspace.

== Galleries ==
=== 1st Floor ===
The first floor features the Durham Gallery, a rotating exhibit space for short-term exhibits, either from the museum's collection, or travelling exhibits from other museums. The Walter Wallace Military Gallery, named after Lt. Col. Walter Wallace, former commanding officer of the 49th Field Regiment and past President of the Royal Canadian Legion Branch 25, features the military history of the Sault. It includes many artefacts, diaries, trench art, medals, and information of major battles Saultites fought in. There is also a gift shop, featuring local art and handicrafts.

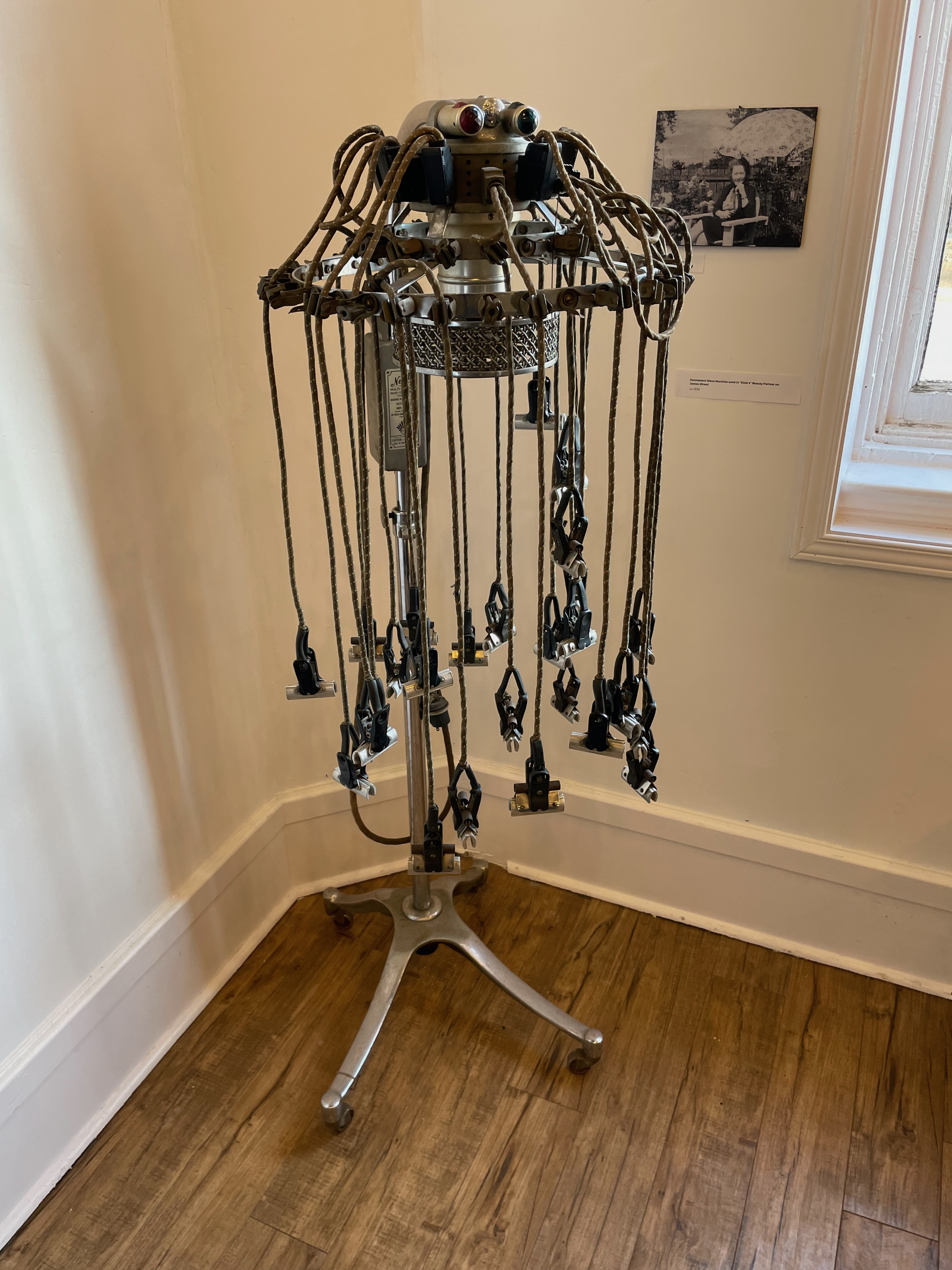
Permanent wave machine, c. 1930

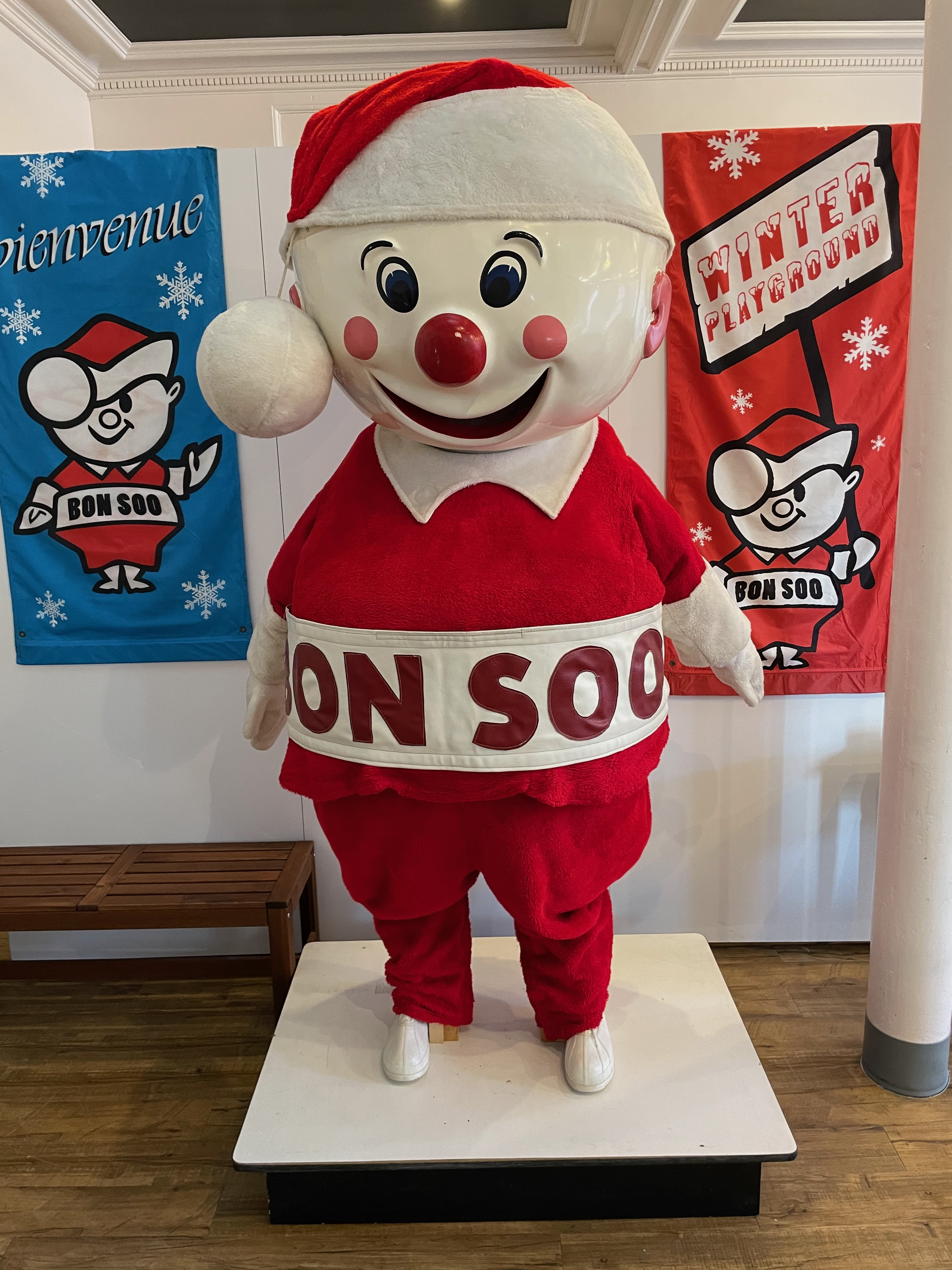
Mr. Bon Soo

=== 2nd Floor ===
The second floor features the Skylight Gallery, showcasing an in-depth history of Sault Ste. Marie and area. It displays artefacts of the Indigenous first peoples of the region, including a birch bark wigwam and canoe, as well as information and artefacts from the region's history of fur trading, the War of 1812 (including a model replica of the HMS Caledonia), mining, lumbering, nursing, policing and fire management. The Discovery Gallery is a hands-on gallery with natural history and artifacts for children to play and interact with, including dress-up.

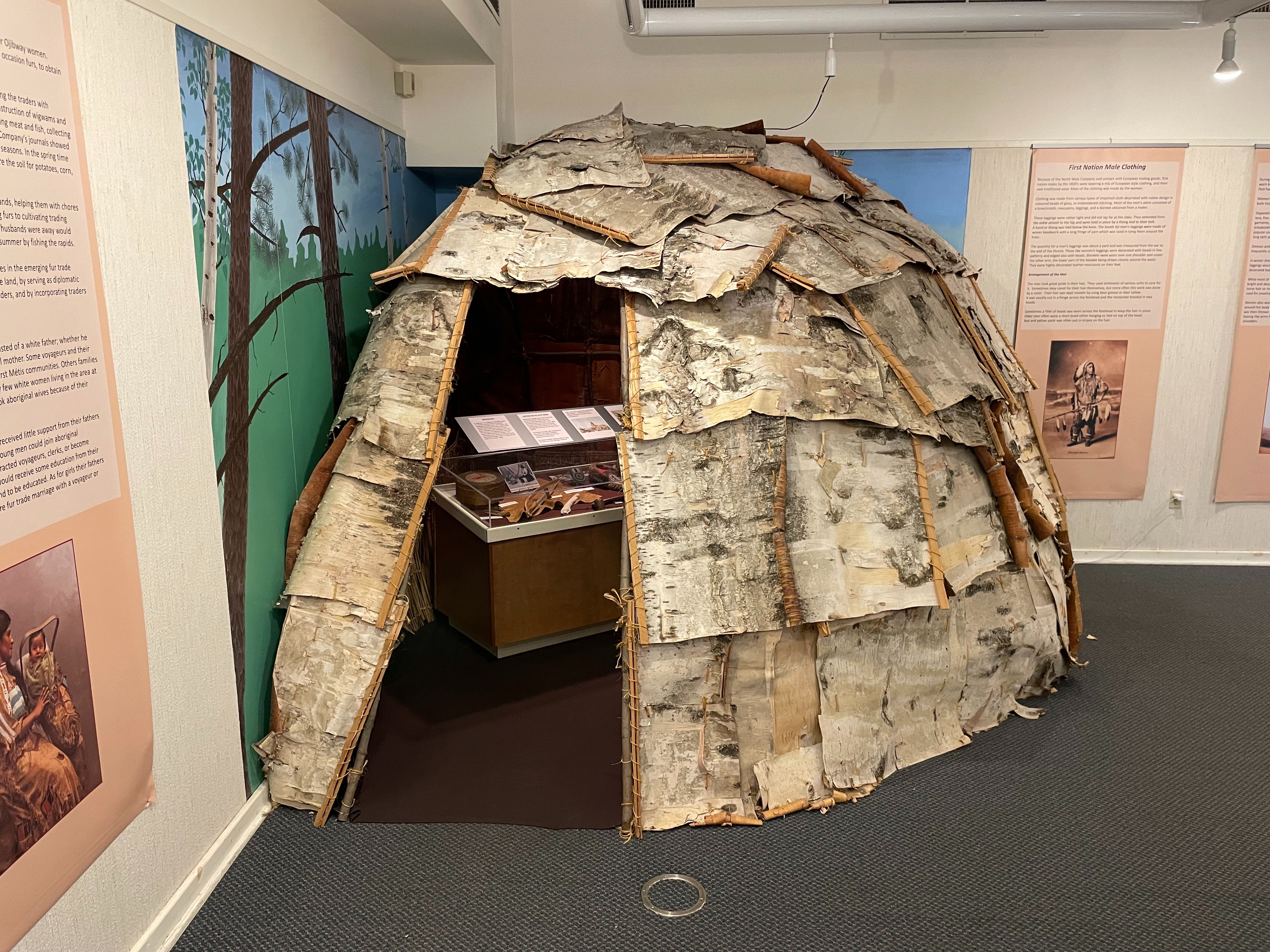
Wigwam

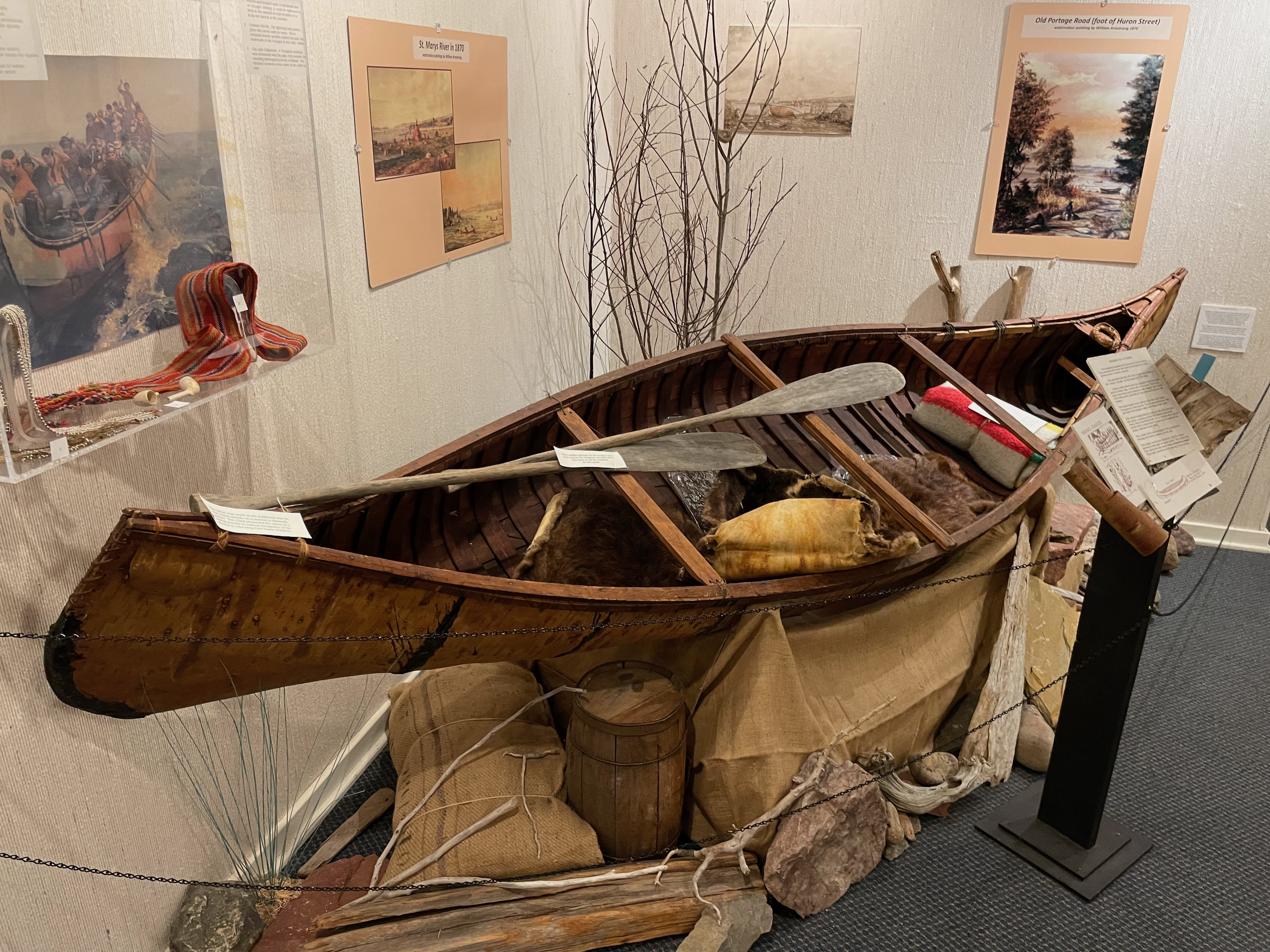
Birch bark canoe

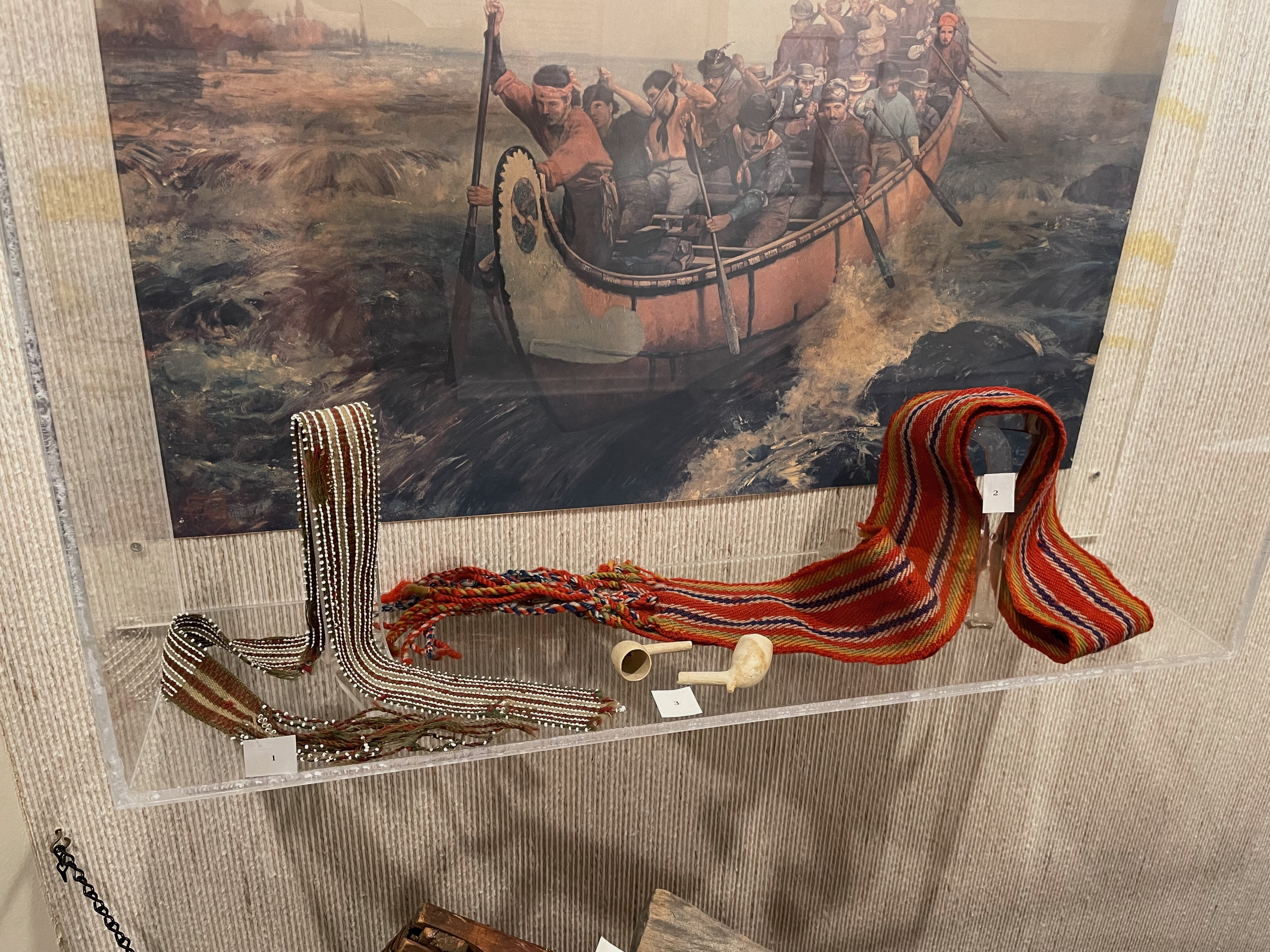
Métis sash, clay pipe fragments and ceinture fléchée

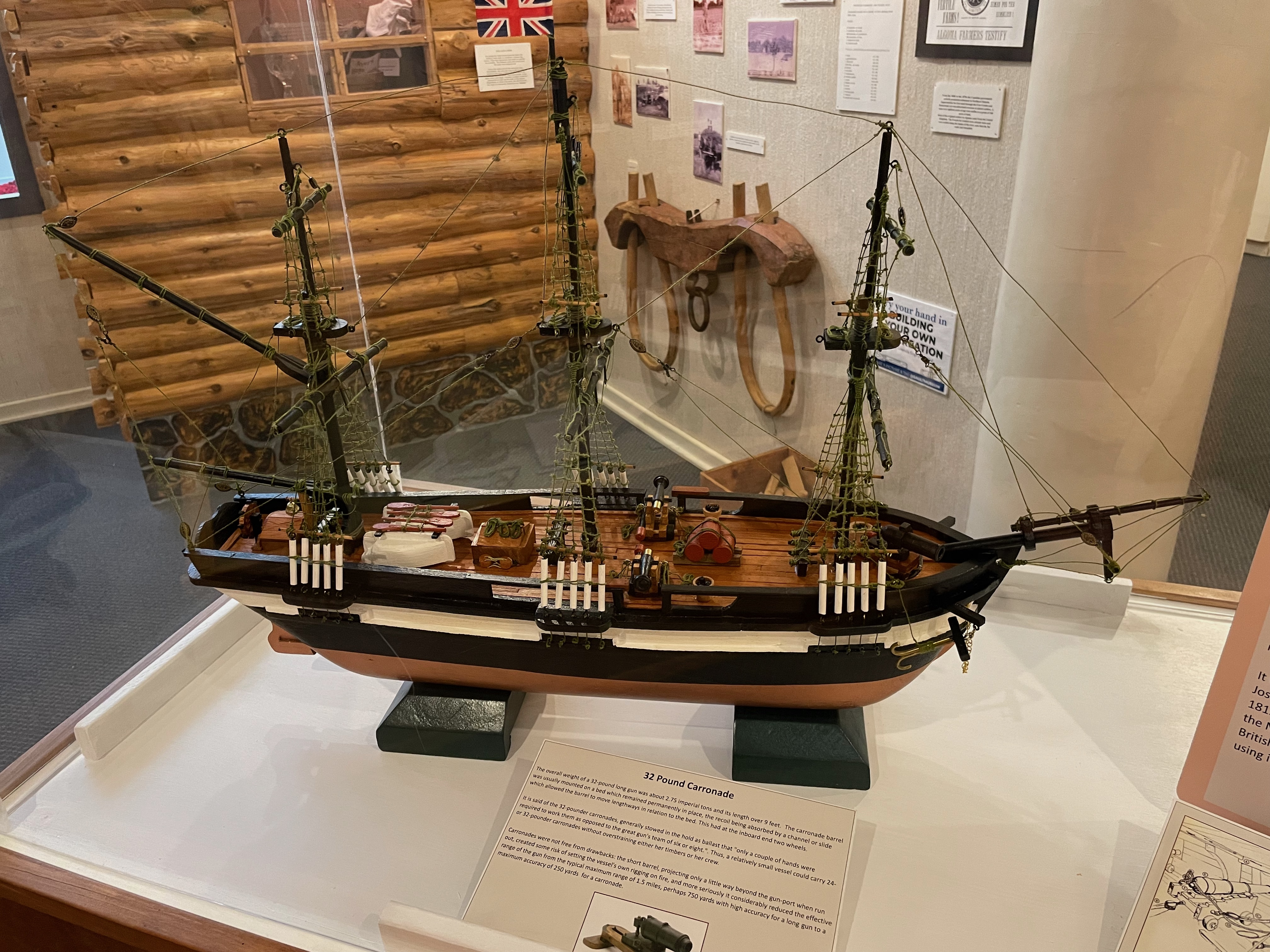
Model of HMS Caledonia

=== 3rd Floor ===
The third floor features the Marine Gallery, showcasing the maritime history of the Great Lakes, including model replicas of the Chicora and the SS Edmund Fitzgerald. The Russell H. Ramsay Sports Hall of Fame is named after sportscaster and former MPP Russ Ramsay, features the sporting history of the region. It includes an Eliason motor toboggan, and history of the Soo Greyhounds. The Music Gallery features the history of venues and musicians from the Sault and area.

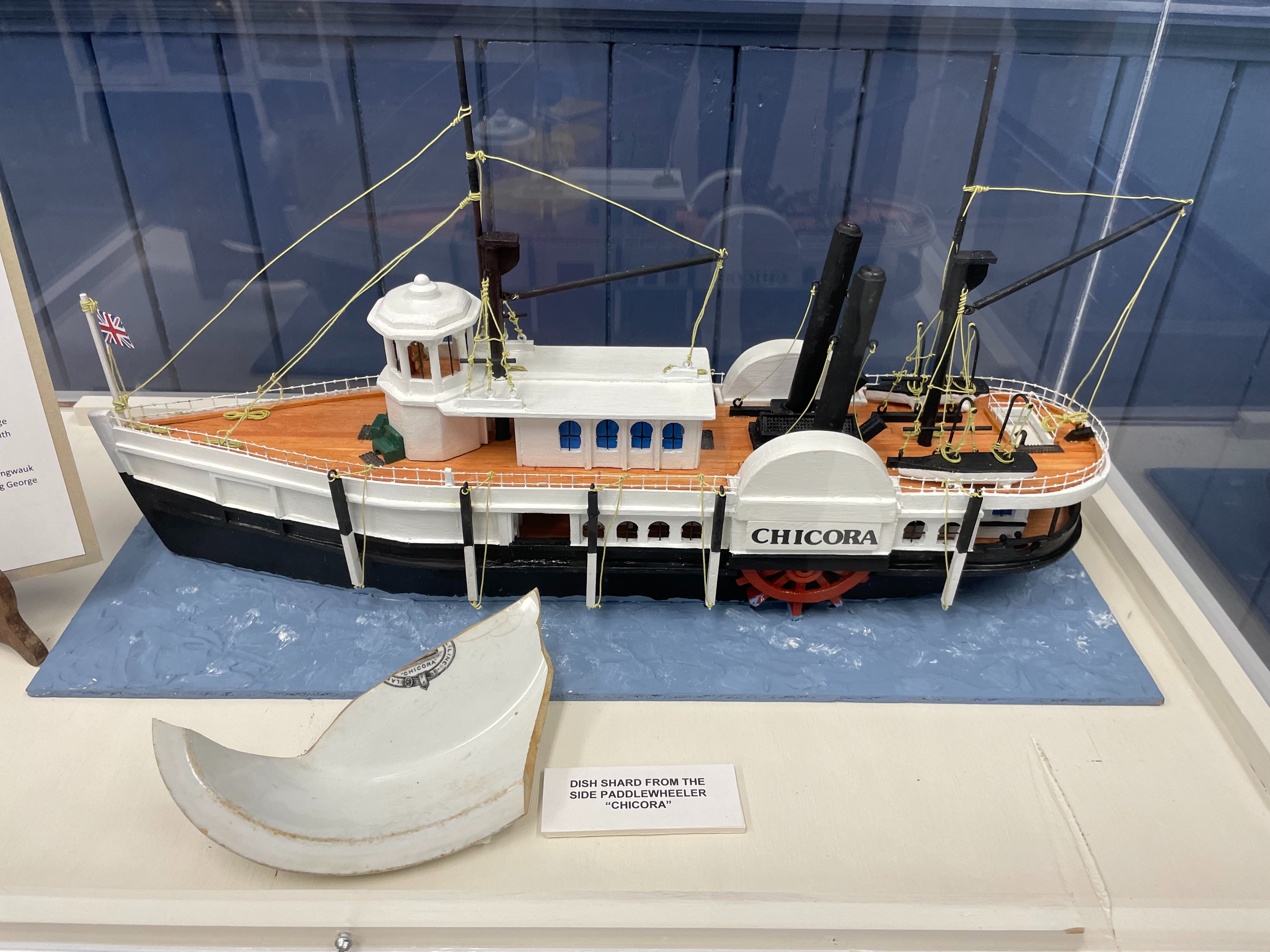
Model of paddle steamer Chicora

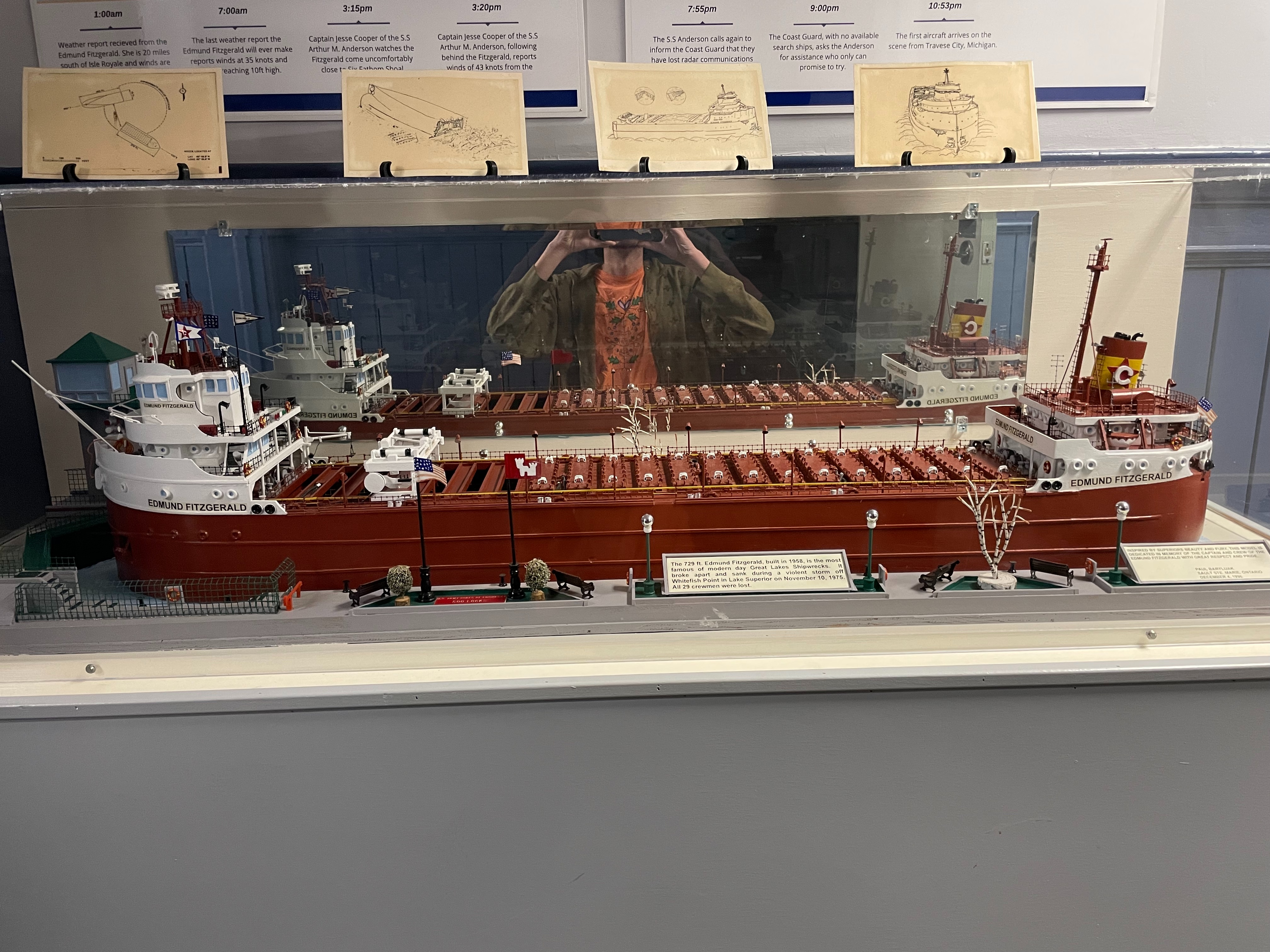
Model of SS Edumund Fitzgerald

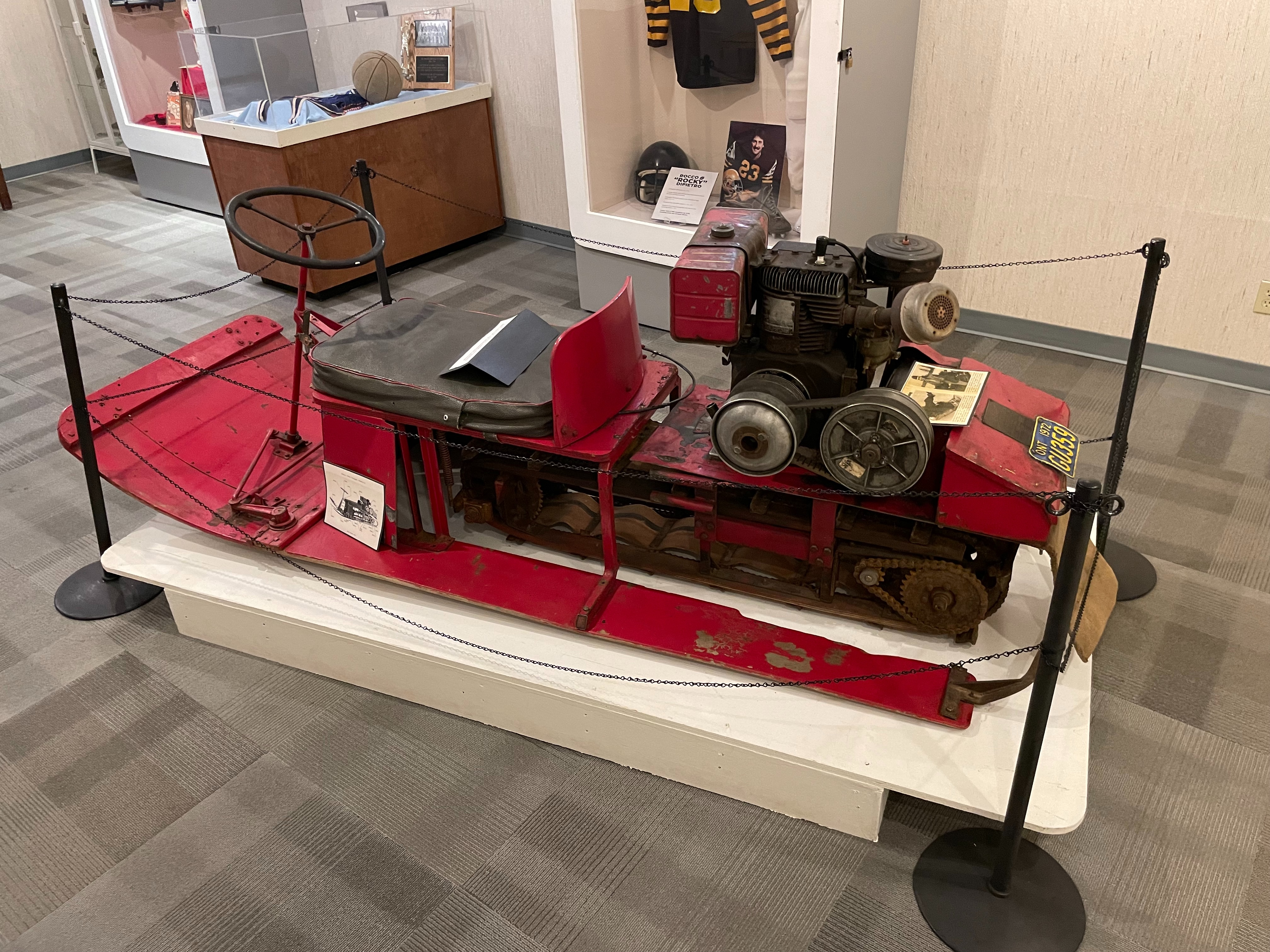
Eliason motor toboggan Model K-12

== Services ==
The museum offers self-guided tours Tuesday–Saturday, 10:00 a.m. to 4:00 p.m, as well as guided group tours. They also offer digitization services and venue rentals. The museum runs a podcast, called "Stories of Northern Life".

== Partnerships ==
The Sault Ste. Marie Museum has archival agreements with the Sault Ste. Marie Library, The Sault Star and Sault This Week, as well as CTV. They are partnered with many local groups, including:

- The ArtSpeaks Project, building resiliency through art-based learning
- Algoma Weavers Guild, the longest continually-running weavers guild in Ontario
- Macleod Highland Dance Studio
- Fringe North Festival
- Petite Nuptials, an elopement and micro-wedding service
