= HMCS Frédérick Rolette =

Royal Canadian Navy offshore patrol vessel

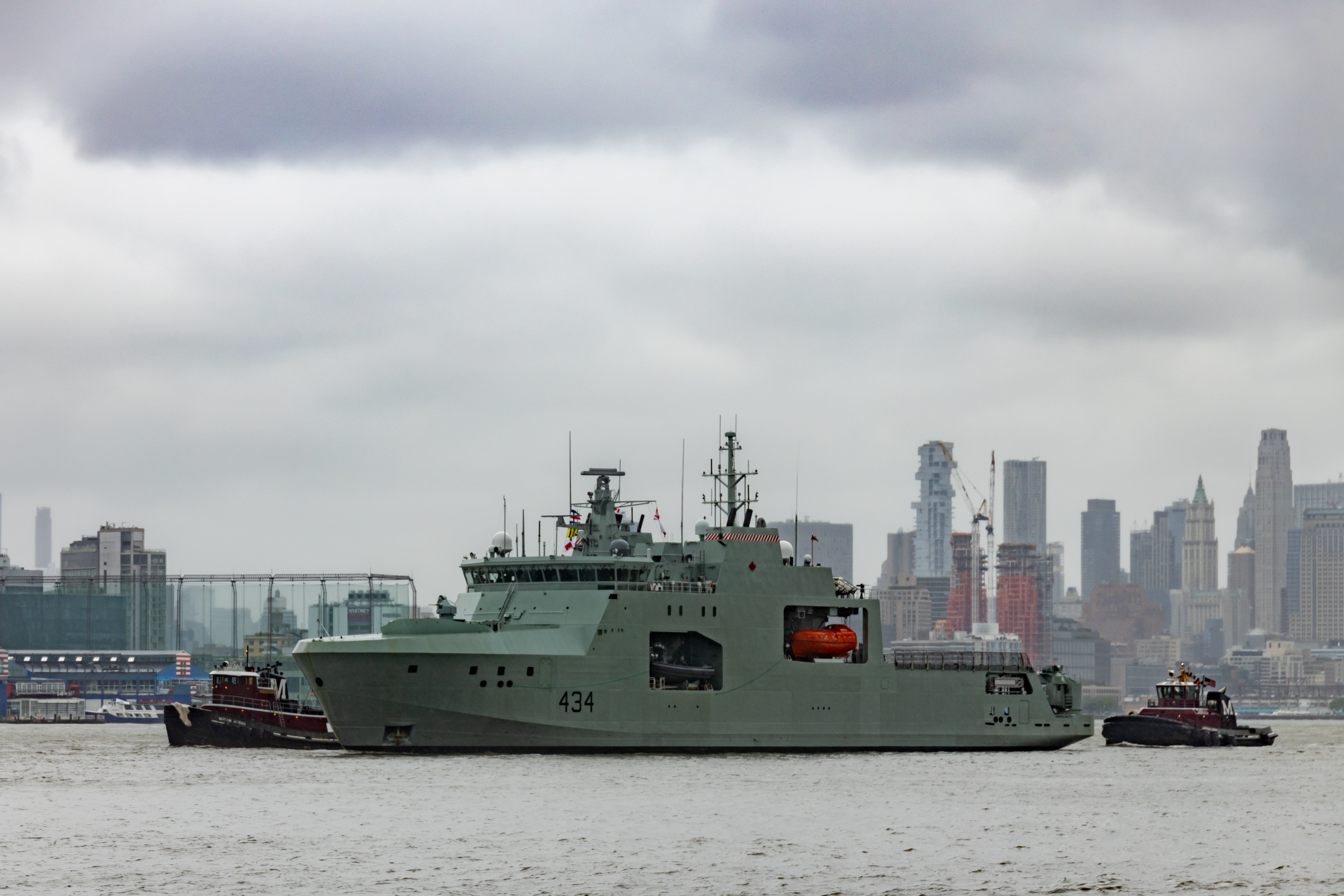
- HMCS Frédérick Rolette visiting New York City on 21 May 2025

History

Canada
- Name: Frédérick Rolette
- Namesake: Frédérick Rolette
- Builder: Irving Shipbuilding, Halifax, Nova Scotia
- Laid down: 29 June 2022
- Launched: 9 December 2023
- Completed: 29 August 2024
- Commissioned: 13 June 2025
- Home port: Halifax
- Identification: Hull number: AOPV 434; IMO number: 4702541
- Status: In service

General characteristics
- Type: Harry DeWolf-class offshore patrol vessel
- Displacement: 6,615 t (6,511 long tons)
- Length: 103.6 m (339 ft 11 in)
- Beam: 19.0 m (62 ft 4 in)
- Draught: 5.7 m (18 ft 8 in)
- Ice class: Polar Class 5
- Installed power: 4 × MAN 6L32/44CR (4 × 3.6 MW)
- Propulsion: Diesel-electric; Two shafts (2 × 4.5 MW); Bow thruster
- Speed: 17 kn (31 km/h; 20 mph) (open water); 3 kn (5.6 km/h; 3.5 mph) in 1 m (3 ft 3 in) ice
- Range: 6,800 nmi (12,600 km; 7,800 mi) at 14 kn (26 km/h; 16 mph)
- Boats & landing craft carried: 2 × 8.5 m (28 ft) multi-role rescue boats; 12 m (39 ft) landing craft
- Complement: 65
- Armament: 1 × BAE Mk 38 25 mm (0.98 in) gun; 2 × M2 Browning machine gun
- Aircraft carried: Sikorsky CH-148 Cyclone or other helicopters/CU-176 Gargoyle UAV
- Aviation facilities: Hangar and flight deck

Frédérick Rolette (AOPV 434) is the fifth Harry DeWolf-class offshore patrol vessel of the Royal Canadian Navy. The class was derived from the Arctic Offshore Patrol Ship project as part of the National Shipbuilding Procurement Strategy and is primarily designed for the patrol and support of Canada's Arctic regions.

It was named to honour the naval hero, Lieutenant Frédérick Rolette.

== Construction and career ==
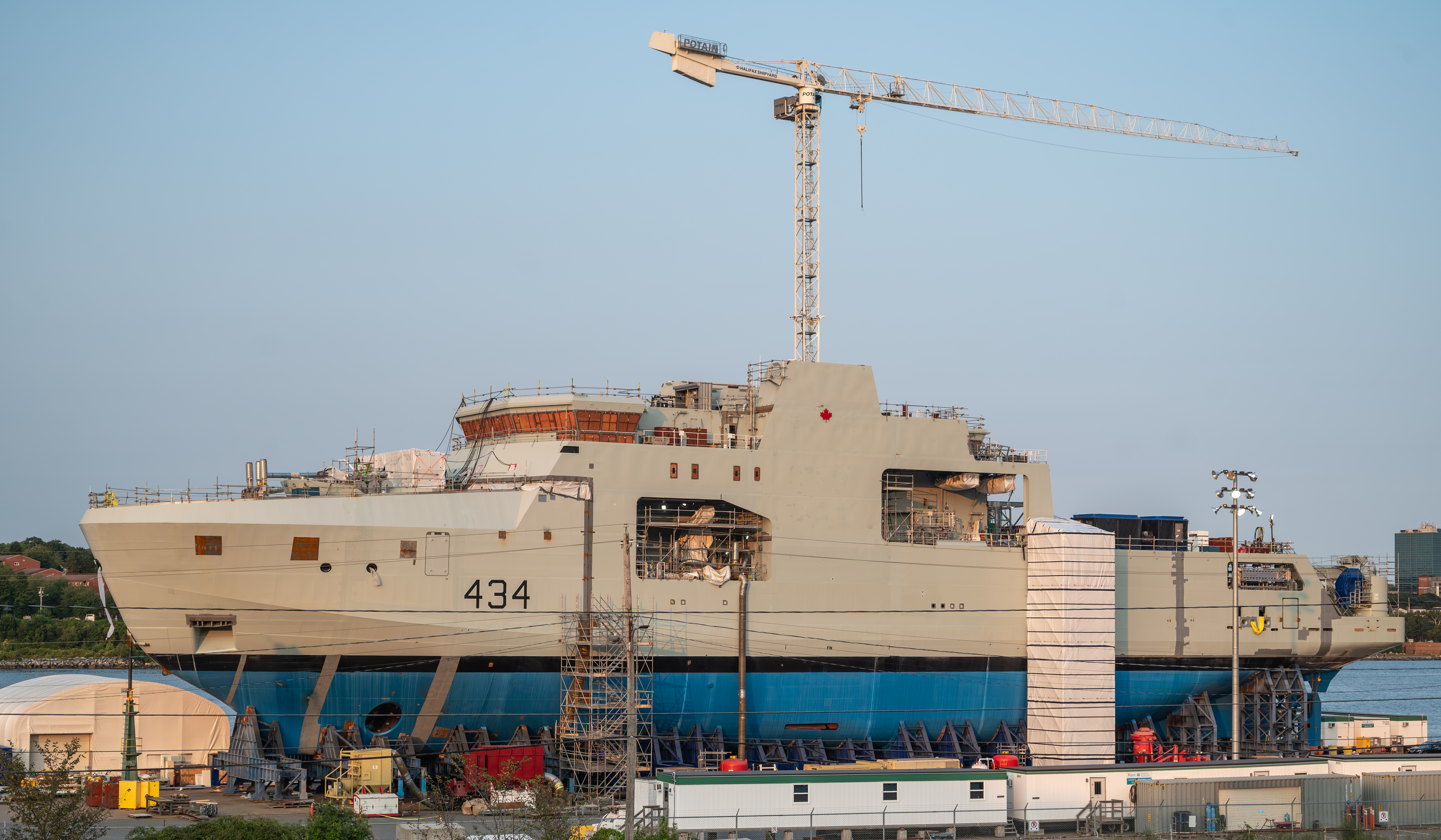
HMCS Frédérick Rolette under construction in Halifax, Canada

The first steel was cut for Frédérick Rolette on 20 May 2021. The keel was laid on 29 June 2022. The ship was launched on 9 December 2023 and delivered on 29 August 2024.

The ship was commissioned on 13 June 2025.
