= Chicora incident =

Diplomatic incident

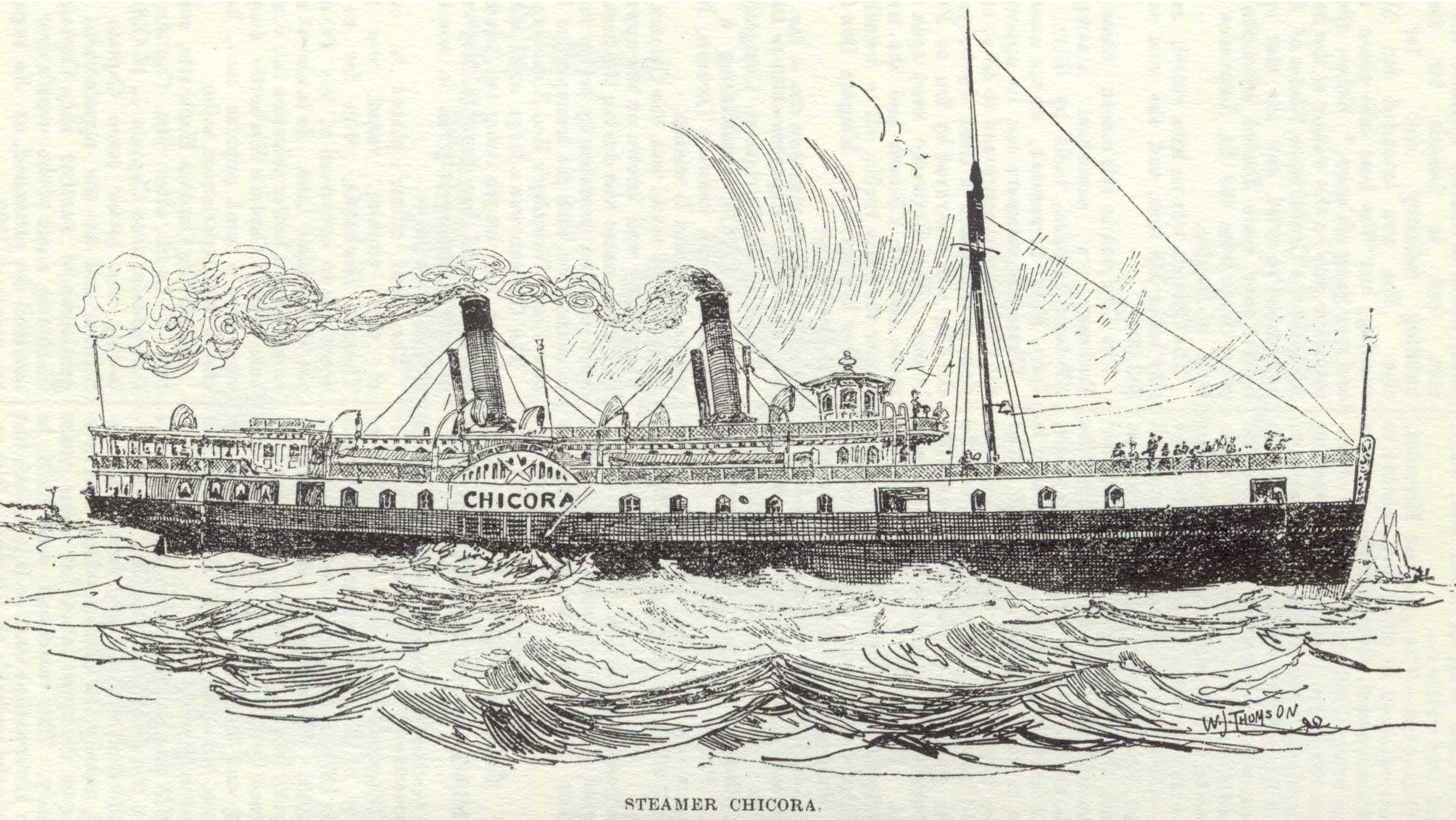
- Paddle steamer Chicora drawing, W. J. Thompson
- Date: May 1870
- Location: Sault Sainte Marie
- Cause: Red River Rebellion; Refusal to allow Chicora to pass through locks
- Participants: United States; Colonel Garnet Wolseley
- Outcome: Chicora allowed to pass through canal Building of the Sault Ste. Marie Canal

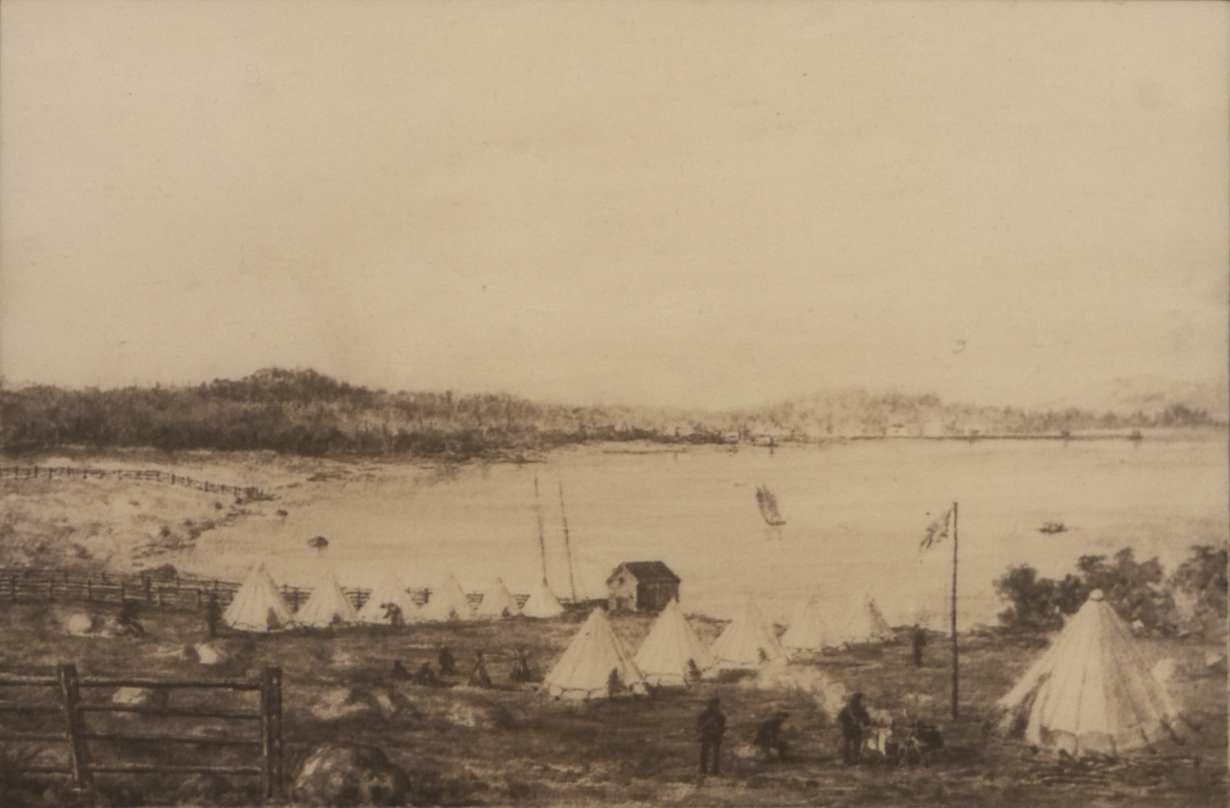
Encampment of Wolseley expedition, 1870, at Sault-Ste-Marie, Canada, Samuel Kay

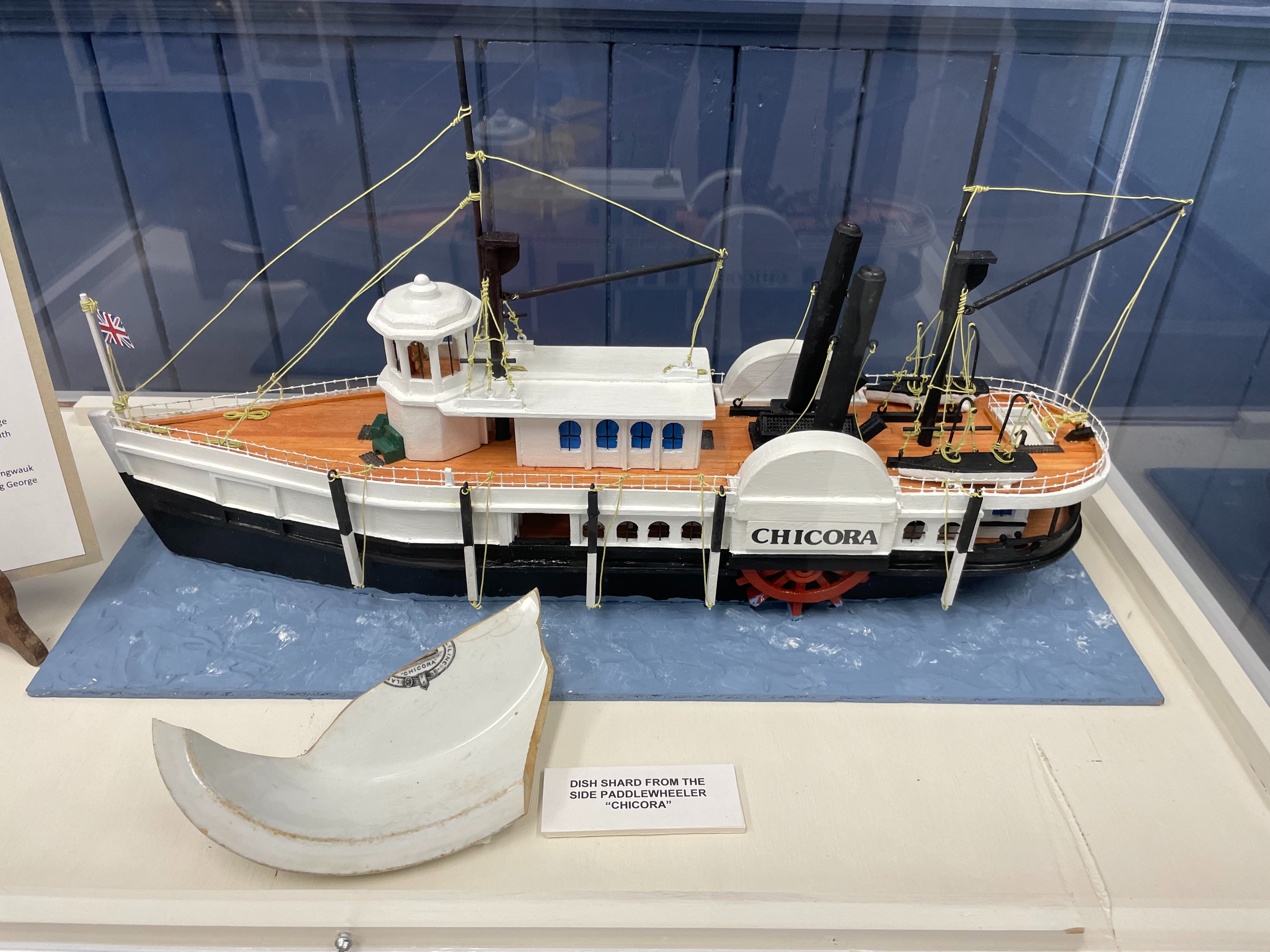
Model of the Chicora, Sault Ste. Marie Museum

The Chicora incident was an incident in May 1870 between the American government and an expeditionary force consisting of British and Canadian militia under the command of Colonel Garnet Wolseley in Sault Sainte Marie. US authorities blocked passage of the Chicora for several weeks, delaying Wolseley's response to the Red River Rebellion. The incident ultimately led to the construction of the Sault Ste. Marie Canal on the Canadian side of the river, allowing unfettered access to the Lake Superior.

== History ==
In May 1870, Colonel Wolseley and his British troops, being transported on the steamer Chicora, were heading west to supply munitions, soldiers, and supplies to Fort Garry in Manitoba to quell the Red River Rebellion occurring in that province.

The Sault Sainte Marie Canal, under the administration of the United States, refused to allow the Chicora to pass through. This was likely due to Wolseley's support for the South during the American Civil War and also the role of SS Chicora's role as a blockade runner during the Civil War. In response, the Chicora was forced to unload its passengers and supplies, with soldiers having to portage from Lake Huron to Lake Superior. However, the steamer was still unable to pass and forced to dock for two weeks before it was allowed to pass through the locks after intervention from the British ambassador (then British Minister to the United States Edward Thornton, 2nd Count of Cacilhas).

The incident raised questions regarding Canadian dependency on the American canal, and spurred the construction of the Sault Ste. Marie Canal on the Canadian side, which was finished in 1895.

== Commemoration ==
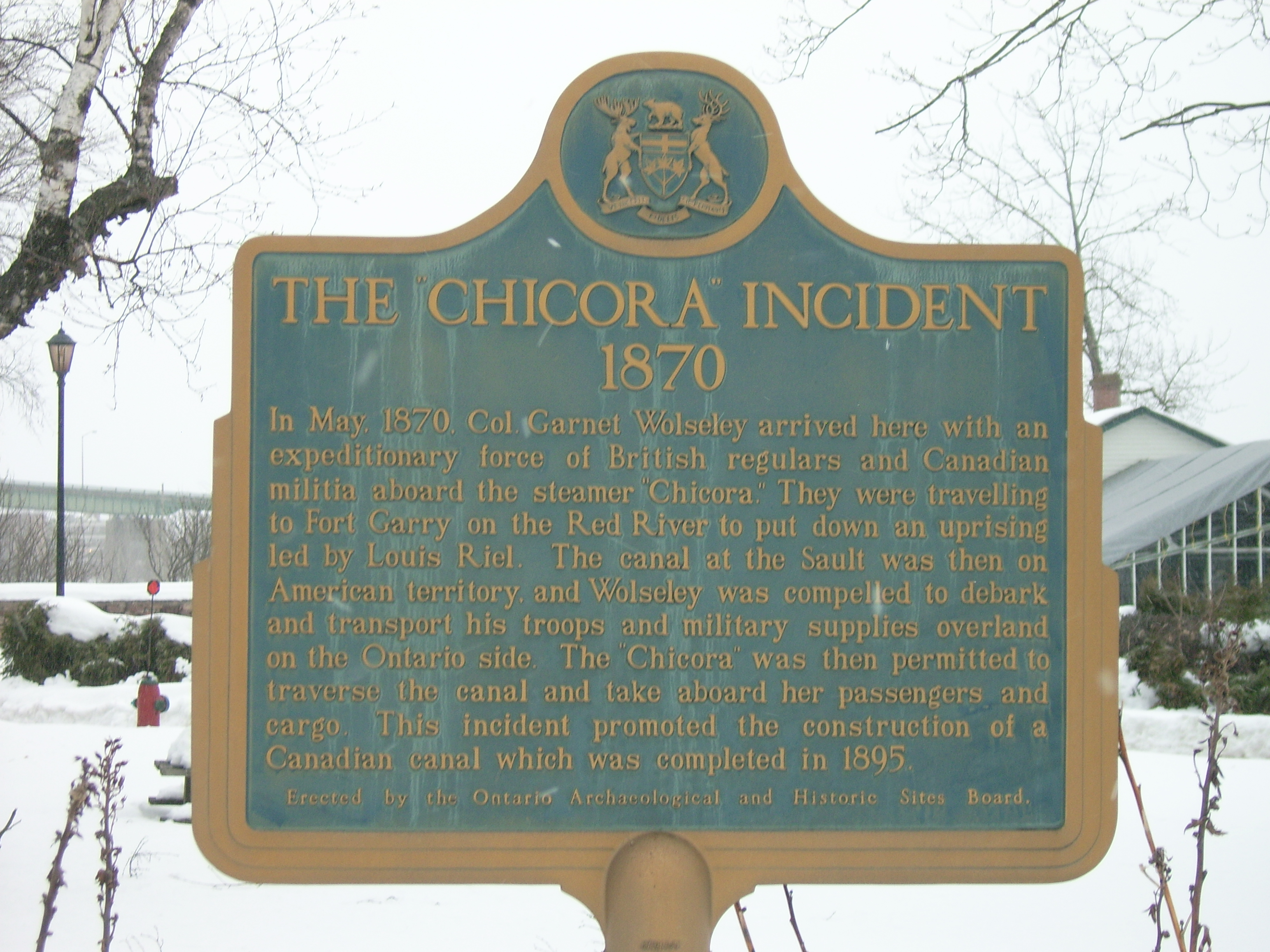
Ontario Heritage Trust plaque

Today, the Chicora incident is commemorated today through an Ontario Heritage Trust plaque. The plaque and the incident are also interpreted through the Parks Canada staff at the Sault Ste. Marie Canal.
