= HMS Caledonia (1807) =

Brig of the Royal Navy

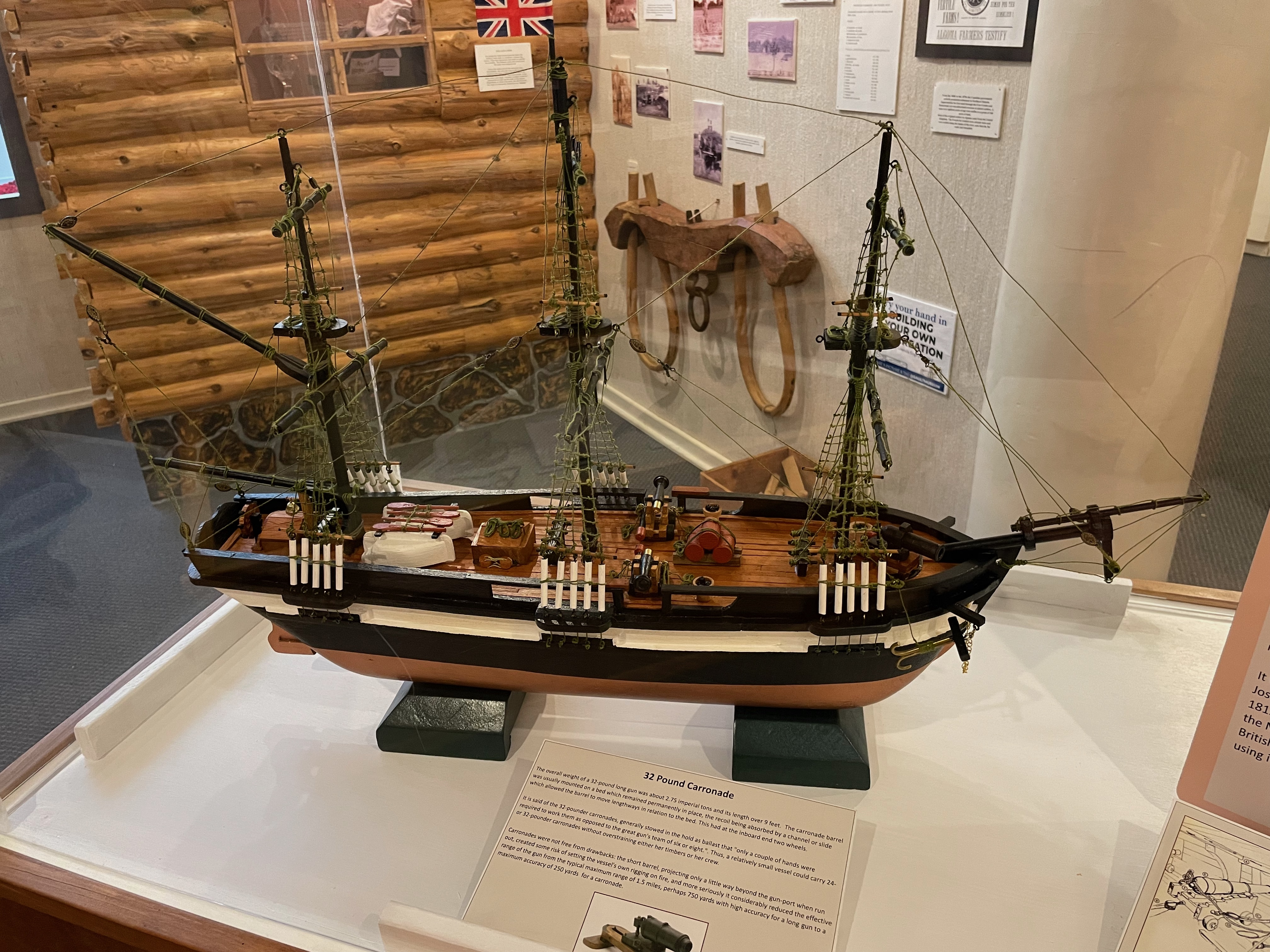
- Model of HMS Caledonia, Sault Ste. Marie Museum

History

United Kingdom
- Name: HMS Caledonia
- Namesake: Caledonia, Latin name for Scotland
- Builder: Amherstburg Royal Naval Dockyard
- Launched: 1807
- Fate: Captured, 9 October 1812

General characteristics
- Type: Brig
- Propulsion: Sail
- Notes: Provincial Marine vessel

Caledonia was a British brig which saw service on the Great Lakes during the War of 1812. Caledonia was built in Malden in Upper Canada for the North West Company, and launched in 1807. During the early part of the War, the vessel was commandeered by the Provincial Marine, and played an important part in the Siege of Fort Mackinac, carrying troops and guns to the island.

On 9 October 1812, Caledonia and Detroit (formerly the American armed brig Adams, which had been captured after the Siege of Detroit) were anchored near Fort Erie in the upper reaches of the Niagara River. Both had been transporting troops and materials eastwards, but Caledonia also carried a valuable cargo of furs. An American boat expedition commanded by Lieutenant Jesse Elliott captured the two brigs. Caledonia was taken to the navy yard at Black Rock, but Detroit was swept away by the current and forced to drop anchor within range of British cannons. After an artillery duel, the cable was cut and Detroit drifted down the river, grounding on Squaw Island (today known as Unity Island) where she was abandoned, and eventually set on fire and destroyed.

Caledonia was taken into American service as USS Caledonia.
