= Sault Ste. Marie Canal =

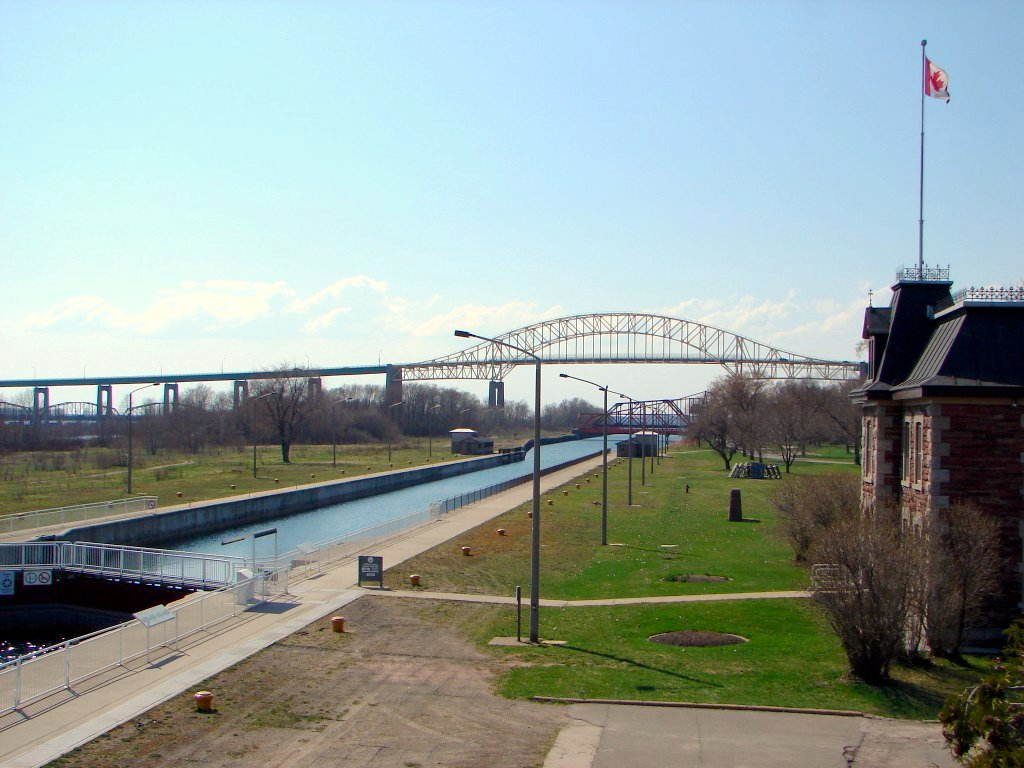
- The Sault Ste. Marie Canal National Historic Site, with the Sault Ste. Marie International Bridge in the background.
- Location: Sault Ste. Marie, Ontario
- Coordinates: 46°30′46″N 84°21′05″W
- Built: 1895
- Governing body: Parks Canada
- Website: Sault Ste. Marie Canal

National Historic Site of Canada

The Sault Ste. Marie Canal is a National Historic Site in Sault Ste. Marie, Ontario, and is part of the national park system, managed by Parks Canada. It includes a lock to bypass the rapids on the St. Marys River.

The first canal near the site was built in 1798, but was destroyed in 1814 during the War of 1812. The present canal dates to 1895, and formed part of the shipping route from the Atlantic Ocean to Lake Superior, along with the two locks on the US side of the river. One of the walls of the lock collapsed in 1987 and the canal was closed to traffic.

In 1998 a smaller lock was opened within the original canal. It is suitable for smaller boats and mostly used for pleasure craft.

== History ==
The first lock was completed in 1798 by the North West Company. On July 20, 1814, an American force destroyed the North West Company depot on the north shore of the St. Marys River. Since the Americans were unable to capture Fort Michilimackinac, the British forces retained control of the Sault. The lock was destroyed in 1814 in an attack by U.S. forces during the War of 1812.

In 1870, the United States refused the steamer Chicora, carrying Colonel Garnet Wolseley permission to pass through the locks at Sault Ste Marie. The Wolseley Expedition incident led to the construction of a Canadian Sault Ste. Marie Canal, which was completed in 1895. This event is now known as the Chicora Incident.

The construction of the canal and lock was completed in 1895. At that time it was the largest lock and first electrically operated lock in the world. The canal is about 1.6 kilometres (1 mi) long and originally the lock portion was 274 metres (899 ft) long and 18 metres (59 ft) wide.

On June 9, 1909, an accident occurred at the lock. The lower gates were closed and the lock was filled with water, while the upper gates were open. The Canadian Pacific steamer Assiniboia was inside the lock, tied up, and the Pittsburgh Steamship Company's freighter Crescent City was entering the lock. Another ship, the Perry G. Walker, was approaching the closed lower gates from below. Despite a sign indicating where the Perry G. Walker should stop, there was a miscommunication between the captain and engineer. As a result, the Walker struck the pier and crashed into the southern gate while moving at approximately 6 miles per hour. This caused significant damage to the lower gate. The impact of the collision led to the water inside the lock rushing out at a speed of over 40 miles per hour, carrying all three ships with it. All three ships suffered severe damage, and the upper gates were also harmed. The rush of water through the destroyed locks was stopped by activation of the Emergency Swing Dam, allowing repairs to commence. Amazingly, there was no loss of life or injury associated with this disaster, and repairs required only 12 days, with the lock reopening on June 21, 1909.

Due to a wall failure in 1987, the historic lock was shut down indefinitely. A new lock, built within the old lock, was opened in 1998 and is 77 metres (253 ft) long, 15.4 metres (51 ft) wide, 13.5 metres (44 ft) deep, with a 3 metres (9.8 ft) draft. The canal is used for recreational and tour boats; major shipping traffic uses the U.S. locks.

== Heritage Designation ==
The canal was designated a National Historic Site in 1987, and is managed by Parks Canada as a unit of the national park system. It welcomes recreational boating and land-based visitors. There are several heritage buildings on the site: the administration building, the superintendent's residence, the canalmen's shelter, the powerhouse and the blacksmith shop, all constructed from red sandstone dug up during the canal's construction. Most of the original machinery used to operate the lock is also still in place. Another unique feature of the site is the Sault Canal Emergency Swing Dam, the only emergency swing dam left in existence, and the only one to ever be used in an emergency.

Guided tours are available in the summer only. The visitor centre is open Mid-June to Mid-October.

The Red River Expedition of 1870, a National Historic Event, portaged nearby, prior to the canal's construction, and was the major reason for its creation.

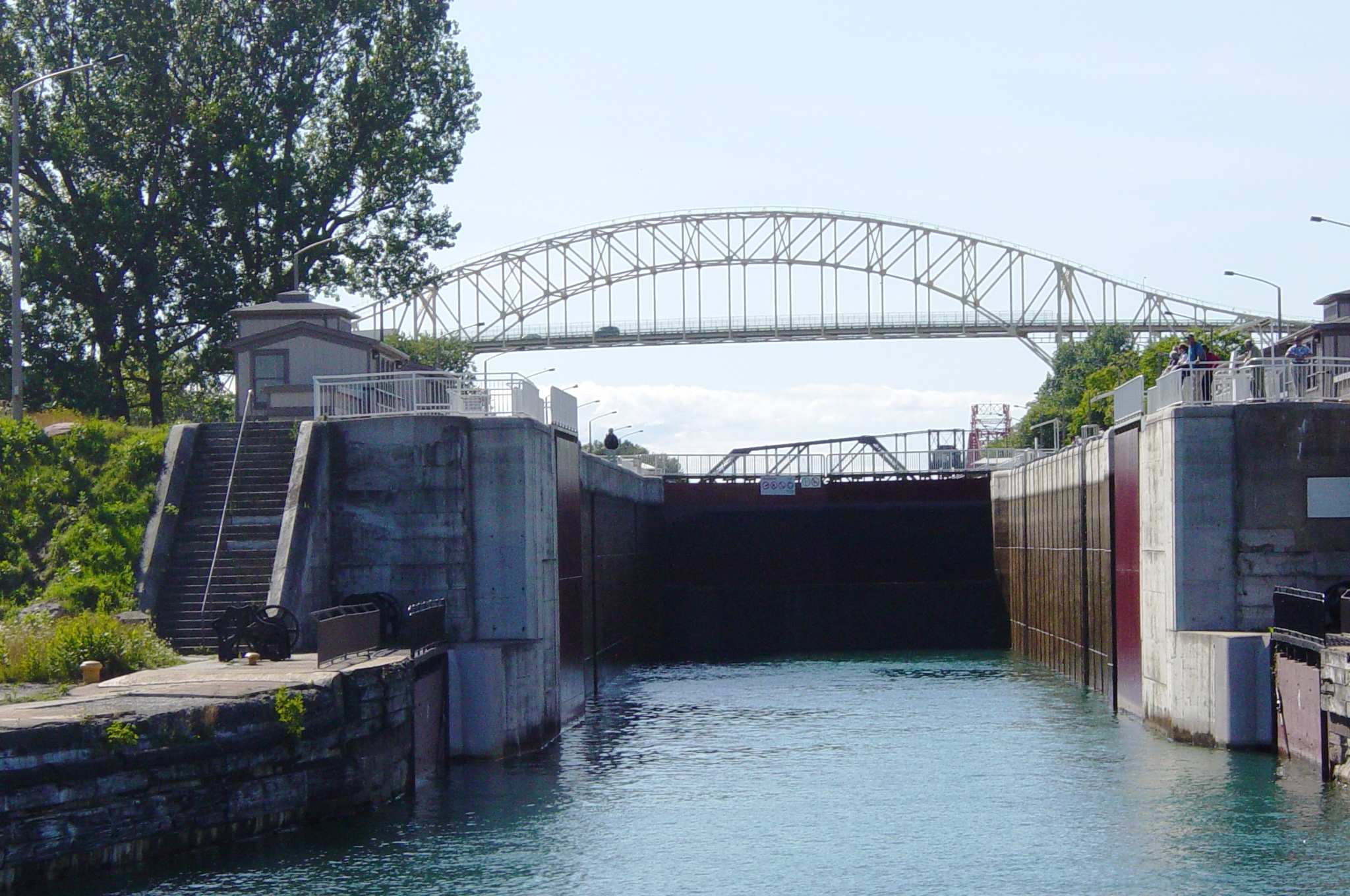
Approaching the open lock from downstream.

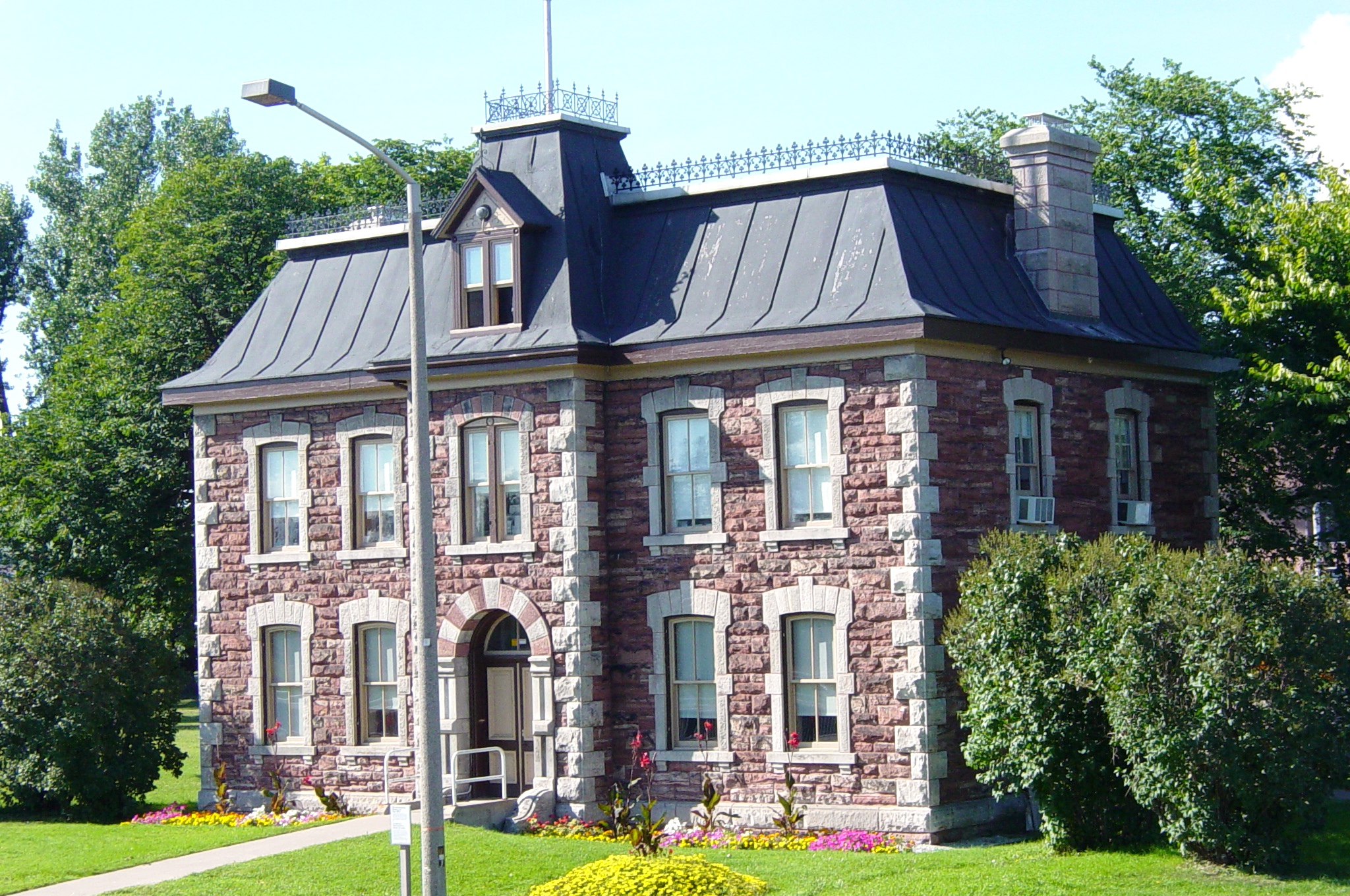
The Administration Building was completed in 1895 - 1896.

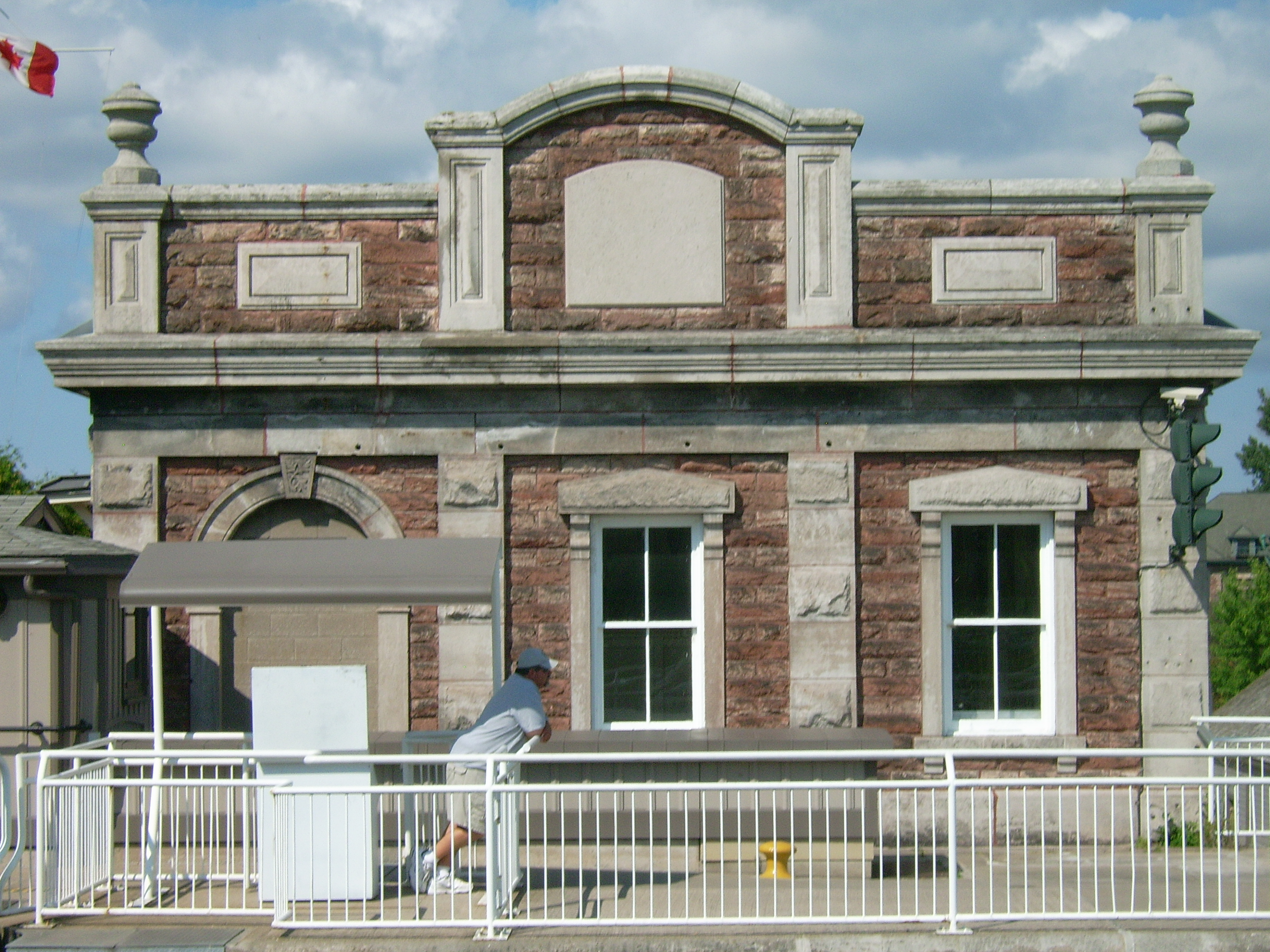
The powerhouse

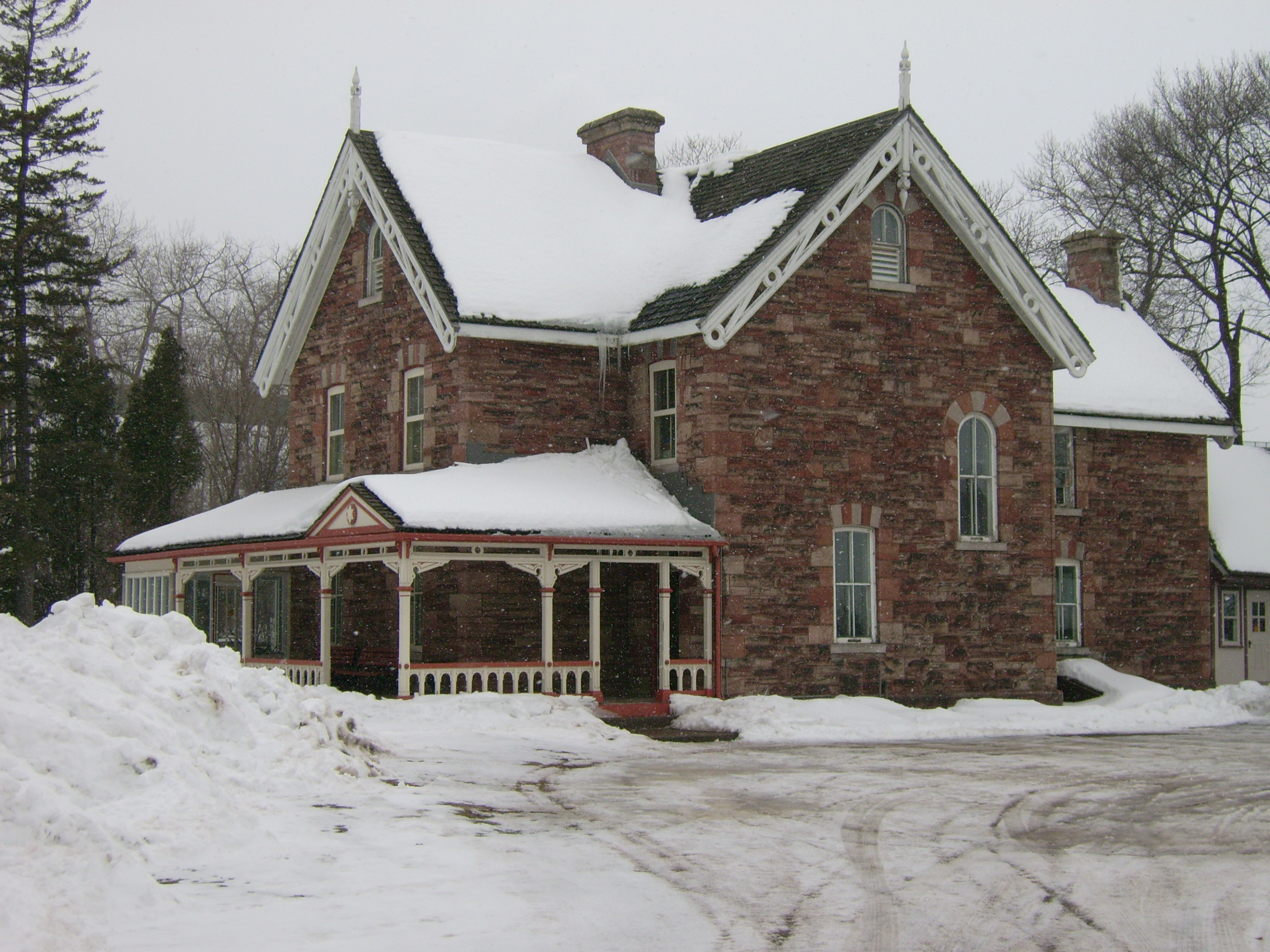
The superintendent's house in winter

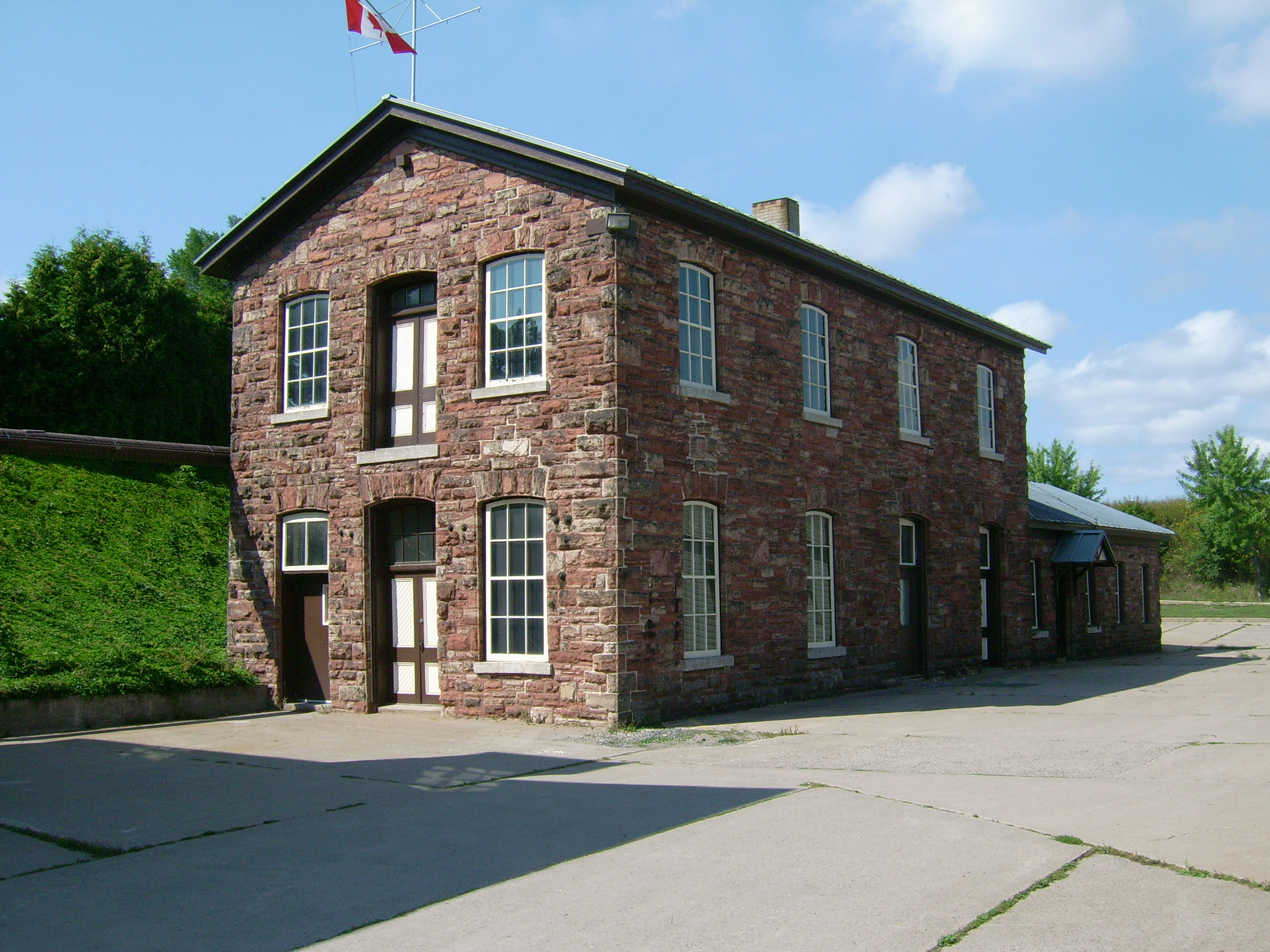
The workshop

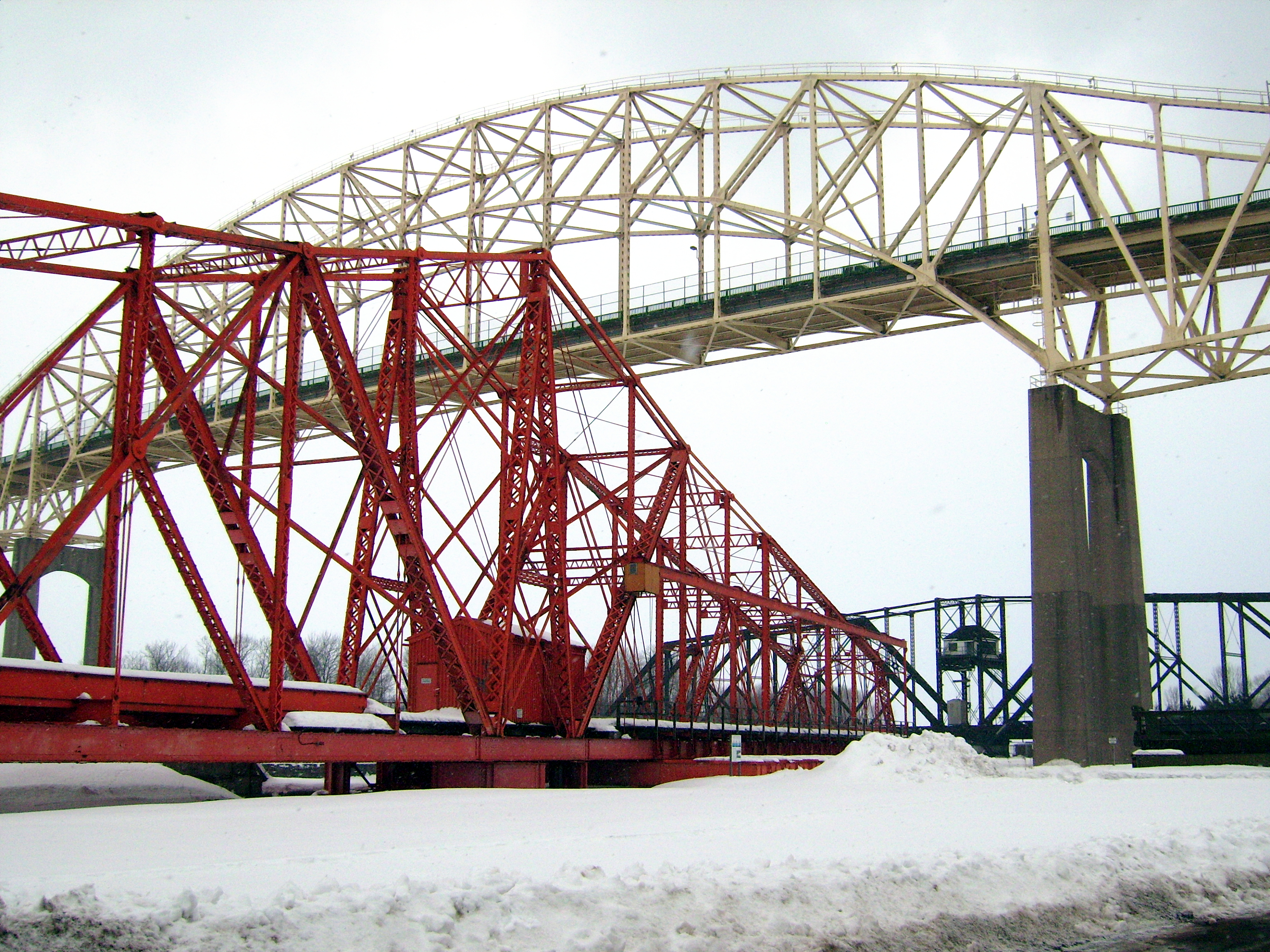
The emergency swing dam, with the International Bridge and International Railroad Bridge in the background

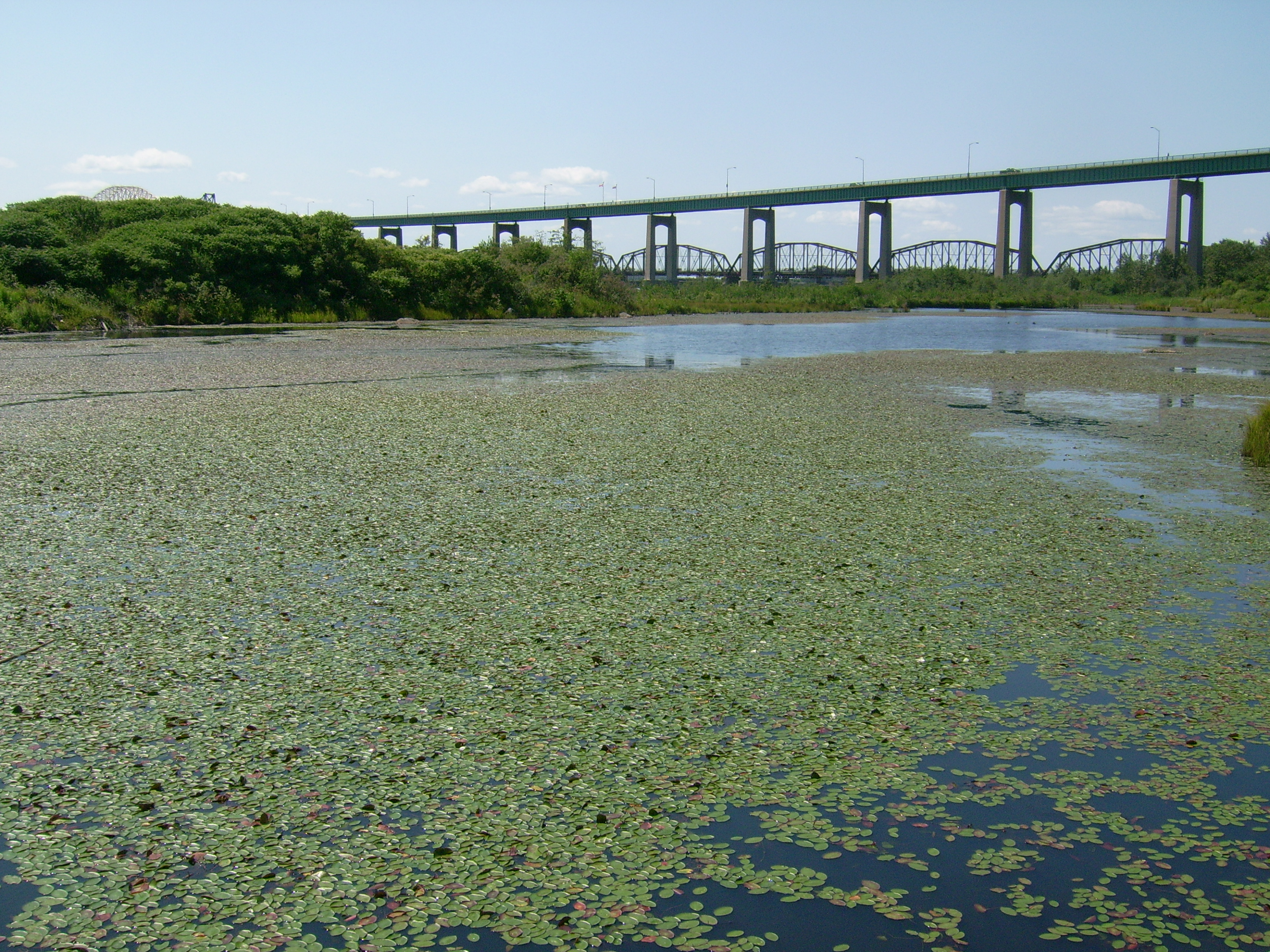
Ponds with Brasenia schreberi along the Attikamek Trail

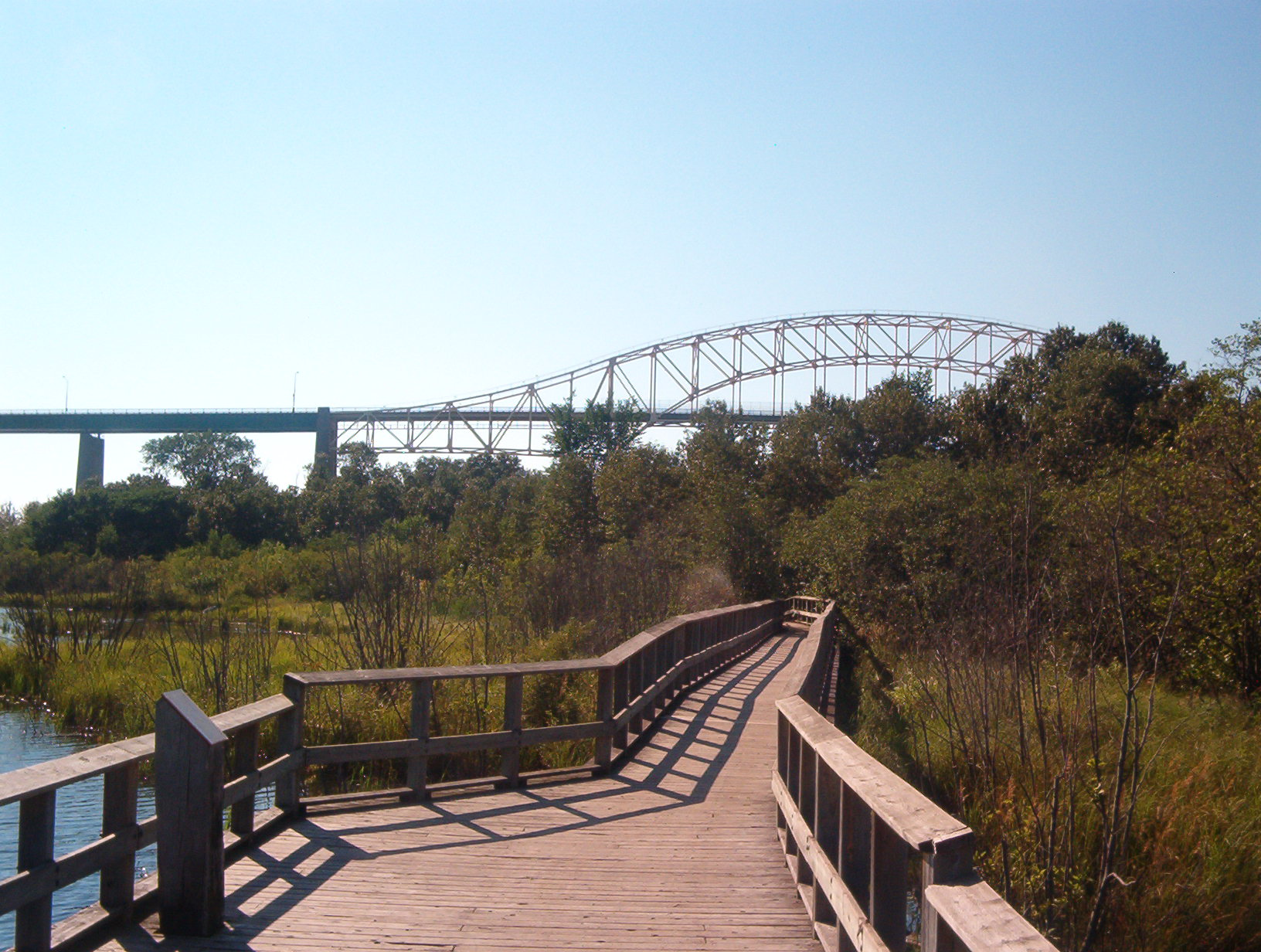
Boardwalk along the Attikamek Trail

== See also ==
- List of national historic sites of Canada
- Soo Locks - Locks on the U.S. side of St. Marys River
- Whitefish Island
