= USS Caledonia (1812) =

Brig of the United States Navy

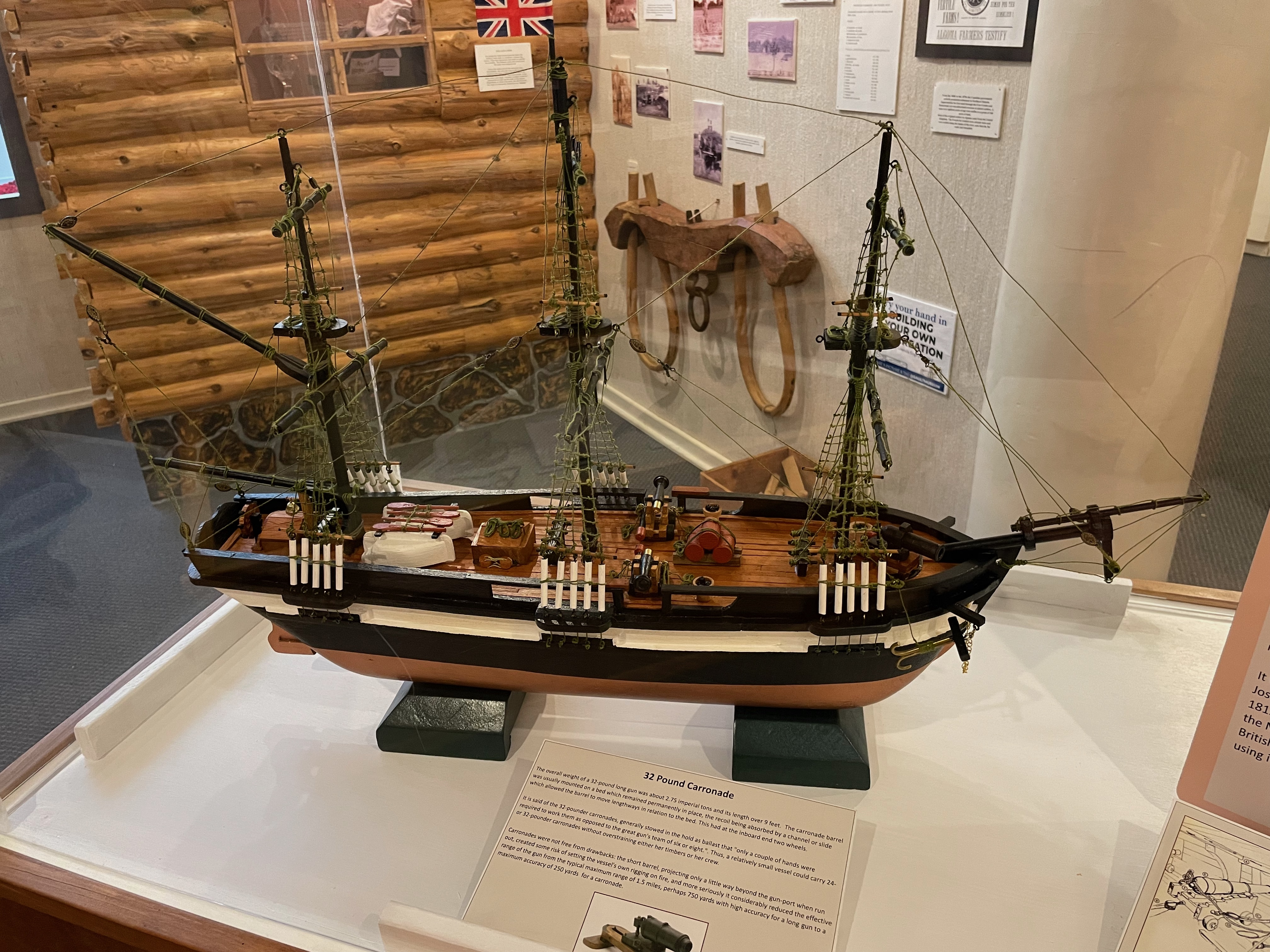
- Model of HMS Caledonia, Sault Ste. Marie Museum

History

United States
- Name: USS Caledonia
- Builder: British at Malden, Ontario
- Completed: 1807
- Acquired: 6 February 1813 at; Black Rock, New York
- Commissioned: 1813
- Decommissioned: Circa 1815
- Stricken: 1815 (est.)
- Captured: 8 October 1812 by the U.S. Navy
- Fate: Sold May 1815 at Erie, Pennsylvania

General characteristics
- Type: Brig
- Tons burthen: 180
- Propulsion: Sail
- Complement: 53 officers and enlisted
- Armament: 2 × long 24-pounder guns; 1 × 32-pounder carronade
- Notes: 80-pound broadside

USS Caledonia was a brig, formerly HMS Caledonia, that the United States Navy captured during the War of 1812 and took into American service. The brig played an important role with the American squadron on Lake Erie, and was sold at the end of the war.

Caledonia was the first warship in the U.S. Navy to carry that name.

== Capture of Caledonia ==
Caledonia was built for the Canadian North West Company at Malden, near Amherstburg in Upper Canada in 1807, for the North American fur trade on the Great Lakes.

In 1812, the brig was taken into military service with the Provincial Marine, a naval transport and protection service in Canada. It played a major part in the Battle of Mackinac Island, transporting artillery which was used to force the American garrison of the island to surrender.

After the American garrison of Detroit surrendered after the Siege of Detroit, Caledonia and the brig Detroit, which had been captured at Detroit, were engaged in transporting troops and stores from Detroit and Amherstburg to the Niagara River, where an American attack was anticipated.

On 8 October 1812, the two brigs were anchored near Fort Erie at the head of the Niagara River. Caledonia carried two 4-pounder guns on pivots, and had a crew of twelve. There were also ten American prisoners aboard, and a cargo of furs worth approximately $200,000, a considerable sum of money at the time.

A boarding party consisting of American sailors under Lieutenant Jesse D. Elliott and soldiers under Captain Nathan Towson boarded and captured both brigs. Adams ran aground under artillery fire on Unity Island in the river and was eventually set on fire to prevent it being recaptured. Caledonia was taken successfully to the navy yard at Black Rock, New York. During the boarding one American sailor was killed and four seriously wounded by a volley of musketry. The twelve Canadian crew members were made captive.

== Service in the War of 1812 ==
The U.S. Navy formally purchased Caledonia on 6 February 1813, and armed the vessel with two long 24-pounder guns and one 32-pounder carronade.

For several months, British batteries on the other side of the Niagara prevented Caledonia and several other schooners which had been purchased by the Navy and were converted into gunboats from leaving Black Rock. On 26 May, the British were defeated at the Battle of Fort George at the foot of the river and were compelled to abandon Fort Erie and the nearby batteries. Lieutenant Oliver Hazard Perry had Caledonia and the other vessels towed by oxen up the fast-flowing river, an operation that took several days. He then sailed with them along the southern shore of Lake Erie to Presque Isle, where the other vessels of his squadron were being constructed.

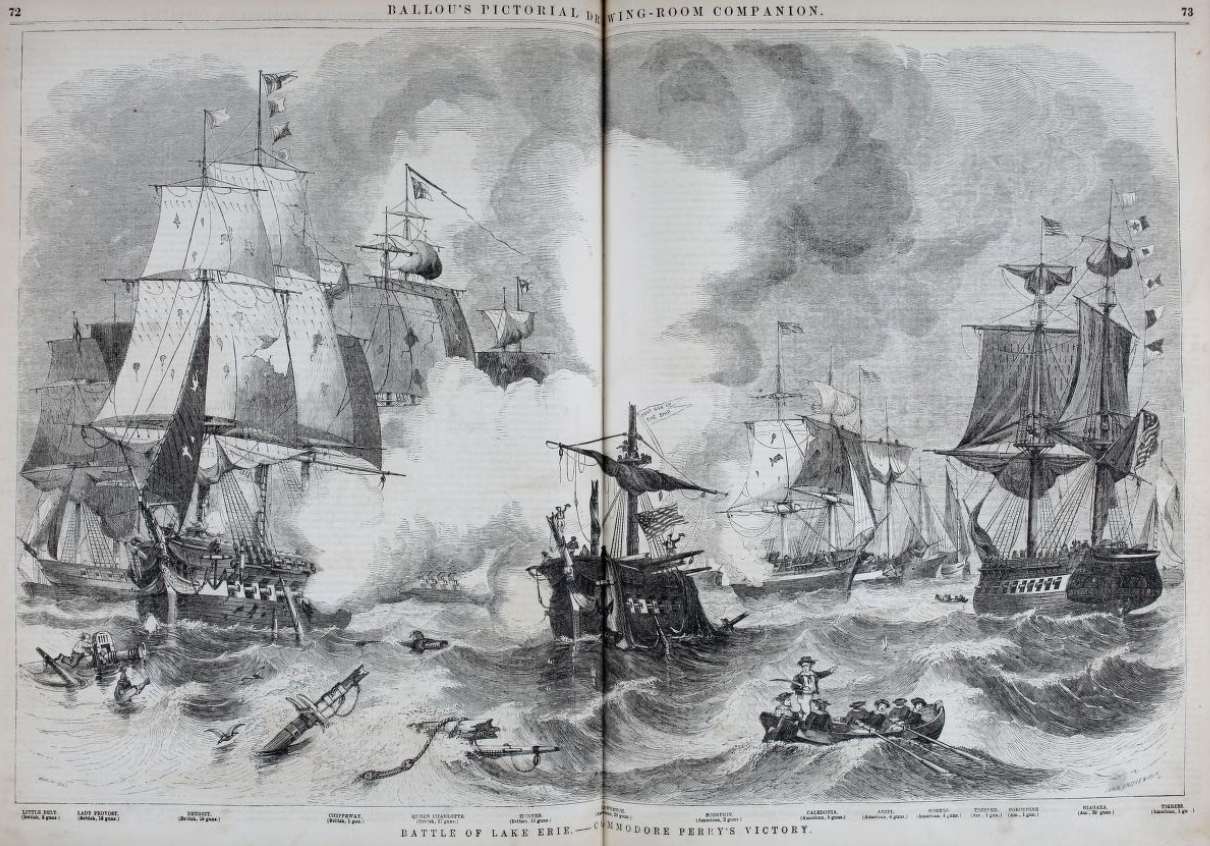
Battle of Lake Erie, Ballou's Pictorial 1856

On 10 September, Caledonia played a key role in the decisive Battle of Lake Erie. Caledonia was commanded in this battle by Lieutenant Daniel Turner, who was praised by Perry for his conduct. For much of the early part of the battle, the other major American vessels were outranged, and only Caledonia's long guns could engage the British flagship and the other British vessels at the center of the battle.

Following the American victory, Caledonia transported American troops to Detroit and Amherstburg, which had been abandoned by the British Army.

In 1814, Caledonia was part of the expedition to Lake Huron, which attempted to recover Mackinac Island.

== Post-war disposition ==
The brig was sold at Presque Isle in May 1815.

Refitted as a commercial ship, she was named General Wayne, and reportedly sank in the 1830s in Lake Erie. However, a 1934 article in the Canadian history magazine "The Beaver" claimed the ship did not sink, but was dismantled in Erie, Pennsylvania.

On 24 July 2009, a story appearing in the Buffalo News mentioned the discovery of an 85-foot schooner on the bottom of Lake Erie, which may be Caledonia. The American company Northeast Research Ltd proposed raising the well preserved wreck and putting it on display near Buffalo, New York. In May 2010 a New York magistrate ruled that this would violate New York's "in situ preservation" policy of leaving shipwrecks intact, and where they are found. The decision has been appealed, and in September 2010 the case is being heard by U.S. District Judge Richard Arcara.
