= HMS Detroit =

Two ships of the Royal Navy have borne the name HMS Detroit, after Fort Detroit. Both served on Lake Erie during the War of 1812:

- HMS Detroit (1812) was a 6-gun brig, previously the American army vessel Adams. She was captured in 1812, but was retaken and burnt later that year.
- HMS Detroit (1813) was a 20-gun sloop launched in 1813 and captured by the Americans later that year, becoming USS Detroit (1813).
