= National Register of Historic Places listings in Erie County, Pennsylvania =

Location of Erie County in Pennsylvania

This is a list of the National Register of Historic Places listings in Erie County, Pennsylvania.

This is intended to be a complete list of the properties and districts on the National Register of Historic Places in Erie County, Pennsylvania, United States. The locations of National Register properties and districts for which the latitude and longitude coordinates are included below, may be seen in a map.

There are 54 properties and districts listed on the National Register in the county. Another 2 properties were once listed but have been removed.

This National Park Service list is complete through NPS recent listings posted July 31, 2026.

== Current listings ==
	Name on the Register	Image	Date listed	Location	Municipality	Description
1	Academy Hall	Academy Hall	November 21, 2006 (#06001055)	Junction of High and Normal streets, Edinboro University of Pennsylvania; 41°52′19″N 80°07′41″W	Edinboro	Italianate-style academic building built in 1857; oldest normal school building in Pennsylvania and oldest building at Edinboro University
2	C.F. Adams Building	C.F. Adams Building	January 7, 2015 (#14001132)	101 E. 6th St. 42°07′47″N 80°05′01″W	Erie	
3	Joshua Bannister Farm		August 3, 2026 (#100013280)	7615 Knoyle Road; 42°05′00″N 79°53′52″W	Erie	
4	Boston Store	Boston Store	October 24, 1996 (#96001194)	716–728 State Street; 42°07′40″N 80°05′04″W	Erie	Art Deco department store completed in 1931; largest and most prominent department store of the 20th century in Erie.
5	Cashier's House and Coach House	Cashier's House and Coach House	January 13, 1972 (#72001121)	413 State Street; 42°07′51″N 80°05′09″W	Erie	
6	Chandlery Corner	Chandlery Corner	February 5, 1987 (#87000030)	1 and 3 East Fourth Street, and 401–403, and 405 State Street; 42°07′53″N 80°05′11″W	Erie	
7	City of Erie Municipal Building		July 16, 2026 (#100013233)	626 State Street; 42°07′43″N 80°05′05″W	Erie	
8	Corry Armory	Corry Armory	May 9, 1991 (#91000509)	205 East Washington Street; 41°55′22″N 79°38′20″W	Corry	
9	Corry Historic District		April 4, 2022 (#100007549)	Roughly bounded by Smith St., Maple Ave., Mill and Church Sts., 2nd and 1st Aves., Allen, Mott, and Grace Sts. 41°55′13″N 79°38′25″W	Corry	
10	Dickson Tavern	Dickson Tavern	January 18, 1990 (#89002256)	201 French Street; 42°08′02″N 80°05′11″W	Erie	Greek Revival building built in 1815; oldest building in Erie
11	Eagle Hotel	Eagle Hotel	October 28, 1977 (#77001167)	32 High Street; 41°56′25″N 79°58′59″W	Waterford	
12	Erie Armory	Erie Armory	December 22, 1989 (#89002073)	6th and Parade Streets; 42°07′58″N 80°04′38″W	Erie	
13	Erie Federal Courthouse and Post Office	Erie Federal Courthouse and Post Office	January 22, 1993 (#92000468)	Junction of 6th and State streets 42°07′44″N 80°05′03″W	Erie	
14	Erie Land Lighthouse	Erie Land Lighthouse	March 30, 1978 (#78002397)	Dunn Boulevard, Lighthouse Park; 42°08′38″N 80°03′44″W	Erie	First lighthouse on the Great Lakes built in the U.S. Current tower constructed in 1867 after the first two were demolished due to foundation problems. Deactivated in 1899, and now the centerpiece of a city park.
15	Erie Masonic Temple	Erie Masonic Temple	August 31, 2020 (#100005518)	32 West 8th St. 42°07′38″N 80°05′06″W	Erie	
16	Erie Trust Company Building	Erie Trust Company Building	August 10, 2000 (#00000967)	1001 State Street; 42°07′32″N 80°04′56″W	Erie	Art Deco office building completed in 1928; tallest building in Erie. Renamed Renaissance Centre in 1996.
17	Federal Row	Federal Row	May 17, 1984 (#84003355)	146–162 East 5th State; 424–430 Holland Street; 42°07′55″N 80°04′57″W	Erie	
18	Girard Commercial Historic District	Girard Commercial Historic District	May 18, 2023 (#100008955)	Main St., roughly between Rice and Penn Aves. 42°00′02″N 80°19′03″W	Girard	
19	Gudgeonville Covered Bridge	Gudgeonville Covered Bridge	September 17, 1980 (#80003491)	Southeast of Girard on Gudgeonville Road; 41°58′57″N 80°16′00″W	Girard Township	Multiple King post-truss covered bridge built in 1868; alleged to have been haunted. Destroyed by fire in 2008.
20	Pierre S. V. Hamot House	Pierre S. V. Hamot House	November 14, 1991 (#91001707)	302 French Street; 42°07′58″N 80°05′09″W	Erie	
21	Harrington Covered Bridge	Harrington Covered Bridge	September 17, 1980 (#80003488)	Barney Road over West Branch Conneaut Creek; 41°52′09″N 80°25′44″W	Conneaut Township	One of two remaining covered bridges in Erie County; Multiple kingpost truss bridge built in 1870.
22	John Hill House	John Hill House	December 17, 1979 (#79002224)	230 West 6th Street; 42°07′41″N 80°05′25″W	Erie	
23	Hornby School	Hornby School	August 13, 2008 (#08000783)	10000 Station Road; 42°07′00″N 79°51′58″W	Greenfield Township	One-room schoolhouse built in 1875; remained in service as a school until 1956. Reopened as a museum in 1984.
24	Jackson Koehler Eagle Brewery	Jackson Koehler Eagle Brewery	April 13, 1982 (#82003785)	2136 State Street; 42°06′55″N 80°04′34″W	Erie	
25	Lawrence Park Historic District		May 14, 2018 (#100002402)	Roughly bounded by East Lake Rd., Lawrence Parkway, Bell St., and Smithson Ave. 42°08′59″N 80°01′02″W	Lawrence Park Township	
26	Lovell Manufacturing Company	Lovell Manufacturing Company	January 16, 1997 (#96001551)	1301 French Street; 42°07′23″N 80°04′44″W	Erie	
27	Main Library	Main Library	April 26, 1979 (#79002225)	3 South Perry Street; 42°07′45″N 80°05′01″W	Erie	
28	Manchester School No. 3	Manchester School No. 3	December 29, 2014 (#14001100)	6610 W. Lake Rd. 42°03′52″N 80°13′59″W	Fairview Township	
29	Mayer Building	Mayer Building	September 10, 2021 (#100006881)	1501-1509 State St. 42°07′15″N 80°04′46″W	Erie	
30	Mercyhurst College	Mercyhurst College	January 23, 2026 (#100012607)	501 E. 38th Street; 42°06′23″N 80°03′17″W	Erie	
31	Modern Tool Company	Modern Tool Company	March 6, 1987 (#87000382)	State and East Fourth Streets; 42°07′53″N 80°05′13″W	Erie	
32	Nicholson House and Inn	Nicholson House and Inn	February 26, 1985 (#85000606)	4838 West Ridge Road; 42°04′13″N 80°11′07″W	Millcreek Township	
33	North East Historic District	North East Historic District	March 9, 1990 (#90000414)	Roughly bounded by Division, North Lake, Eagle, North Pearl, and Gibson Streets; 42°12′56″N 79°50′15″W	North East	
34	Old Customshouse	Old Customshouse	January 13, 1972 (#72001122)	409 State Street; 42°07′52″N 80°05′10″W	Erie	
35	Almerion C. & Barbara Moseman Orton Farm	Almerion C. & Barbara Moseman Orton Farm	October 8, 2020 (#100005655)	7853 Knoyle Rd. 42°04′59″N 79°53′26″W	Wattsburg	
36	Park Dinor	Park Dinor	March 18, 2004 (#04000192)	4019 Main Street; 42°09′02″N 80°00′52″W	Lawrence Park Township	Silk City diner manufactured in 1948; spelling of "dinor" unique to northwestern Pennsylvania.
37	Presque Isle Light	Presque Isle Light	August 4, 1983 (#83002242)	On the shore of Lake Erie in Presque Isle State Park; 42°09′57″N 80°06′55″W	Millcreek Township	
38	Charles Manning Reed Mansion	Charles Manning Reed Mansion	April 19, 1982 (#82003786)	524 Peach Street; 42°07′45″N 80°05′14″W	Erie	
39	Short's Hotel	Short's Hotel	August 25, 1983 (#83002243)	90 South Pearl Street; 42°12′38″N 79°50′13″W	North East	
40	Sommerheim Park Archaeological District	Sommerheim Park Archaeological District	March 6, 1986 (#86000397)	On bluffs above Sommerheim Drive and Presque Isle Bay; 42°06′49″N 80°08′42″W	Millcreek Township	
41	Sturgeon House	Sturgeon House	December 10, 1980 (#80003490)	4302 Avonia Road, Fairview; 42°01′43″N 80°15′14″W	Fairview Township	
42	Thayer-Thompson House	Thayer-Thompson House	October 31, 1985 (#85003443)	605 West 8th Street; 42°07′19″N 80°05′51″W	Erie	
43	U.S.S. NIAGARA	U.S.S. NIAGARA	April 11, 1973 (#73001628)	Erie Maritime Museum; 42°08′14″N 80°05′15″W	Erie	Flagship of Oliver Hazard Perry during the Battle of Lake Erie in 1813
44	Union City Historic District	Union City Historic District	March 9, 1990 (#90000417)	Roughly bounded by Third, High, Main, and South Streets; 41°53′52″N 79°50′52″W	Union City	
45	Villa Maria Academy	Villa Maria Academy	November 8, 1996 (#96001193)	819 West 8th Street; 42°07′14″N 80°06′05″W	Erie	
46	Warner Theater	Warner Theater	April 13, 1982 (#82003787)	811 State Street; 42°07′38″N 80°05′00″W	Erie	Art Deco theater built in 1930 for Warner Bros. and was designed by the architectural firm Rapp and Rapp
47	Waterford Borough Historic District	Waterford Borough Historic District	March 9, 1990 (#90000419)	Roughly bounded by North Park Row, High, West First, and Walnut Streets; 41°56′29″N 79°59′05″W	Waterford	
48	Waterford Covered Bridge	Waterford Covered Bridge	September 17, 1980 (#80003492)	Niemeyer Road over LeBoeuf Creek; 41°56′28″N 79°57′48″W	Waterford Township	One of two remaining covered bridges in Erie County; Town lattice truss bridge built in 1875. Closed to traffic in 2011.
49	Watson-Curtze Mansion	Watson-Curtze Mansion	July 16, 1983 (#83002244)	356 West 6th Street; 42°07′36″N 80°05′37″W	Erie	
50	The Weber House		September 12, 2025 (#100012219)	317 Frontier Drive; 42°07′15″N 80°07′09″W	Erie	
51	West 21st Street Historic District	West 21st Street Historic District	March 9, 1990 (#90000418)	125–262 West 21st Street and 2014–2125 Sassafras Street; 42°06′52″N 80°04′49″W	Erie	
52	West Park Place	West Park Place	September 4, 1980 (#80003489)	Bounded by North Park Row, Peach, 5th, and State Streets; 42°07′48″N 80°05′11″W	Erie	
53	West Sixth Street Historic District	West Sixth Street Historic District	November 1, 1984 (#84000353)	West 6th Street from Poplar to Peach Street; 42°07′35″N 80°05′34″W	Erie	
54	Wright's Block	Wright's Block	March 4, 2022 (#100007461)	425-431 State St. 42°07′50″N 80°05′10″W	Erie	

== Former listings ==
	Name on the Register	Image	Date listed	Date removed	Location	Municipality	Description
1	SS Niagara (freighter)	SS Niagara (freighter)	August 3, 1987 (#87001255)	April 28, 1998	Erie Sand and Gravel Company, foot of Sassafrass Street	Erie	Scrapped
2	Carman Covered Bridge	Carman Covered Bridge	September 17, 1980 (#80003493)	April 28, 1998	Southeast of West Springfield on Township 338	Conneaut and Springfield Townships	Burned down on April 19, 1996.

== See also ==
- List of National Historic Landmarks in Pennsylvania
- National Register of Historic Places listings in Pennsylvania
- List of Pennsylvania state historical markers in Erie County
