= List of Pennsylvania state historical markers in Erie County =

Location of Erie County in Pennsylvania

This is a list of the Pennsylvania state historical markers in Erie County.

This is intended to be a complete list of the official state historical markers in Erie County, Pennsylvania by the Pennsylvania Historical and Museum Commission (PHMC). The locations of the historical markers, as well as the latitude and longitude, as provided by the PHMC's database, are included when available. There are 53 historical markers located in Erie County.

== Historical markers ==
Marker title	Image	Date dedicated	Location	Marker type	Topics
African Americans in Battle of Lake Erie		September 10, 1996	Erie Maritime Museum, 150 East Front Street, Erie	City	African American, Military, War of 1812
Anthony Wayne		November 1946	East 6th Street at Ash Street, Erie	Roadside	American Revolution, Forts, Military
Canal Basin		April 5, 1948	North end of State State, Erie	Roadside	Canals, Navigation, Transportation
Captain C.V. Gridley		November 1946	East Lake Road, Erie	Roadside	Military, Military Post-Civil War
Captain Daniel Dobbins		September 13, 2003	Dobbins Landing, foot of State Street, Erie; 42.13768°N 80.09075°W	Roadside	George Washington, Military, War of 1812
Cashier's House		1980	417 State Street, Erie; 42.131°N 80.0862°W	Roadside	Buildings, Business & Industry, Houses & Homesteads
Circus History		August 21, 1974	US 20 at the Diamond in Girard; 42.00007°N 80.31697°W	Roadside	Performers
Climax Locomotives		May 17, 1987	PA 77 at south end of Corry; 41.91962°N 79.64378°W	Roadside	Business & Industry, Railroads, Transportation
Col. Philip Cochran		November 11, 2001	Erie County World War II Memorial, State Street and Glenwood Parkway, Erie	Roadside	Military, Military Post-Civil War
Col. Strong Vincent		May 1, 1994	Northeast corner of High Street and 1st Street, Waterford; 41.94037°N 79.98285°W	Roadside	Civil War, Military
Colt's Station		October 29, 1951	PA 89 at PA 430, Greenfield Township; 42.11883°N 79.82435°W	Roadside	Government & Politics, Government & Politics 18th Century, Navigation, Transportation
Corry State Fish Hatchery		July 15, 2010	13365 US 6, Corry; 41.93089°N 79.67114°W	Roadside	Environment, Government & Politics 20th Century, Sports
Creation of the Pennsylvania Game Commission		July 24, 2008	Northwest corner of Corry City Park, at the intersection of North Center and Smith Streets	Roadside	Environment, Government & Politics 20th Century
Drake Well Park		November 20, 1946	PA 8 just south of Union City; 41.88958°N 79.84712°W	Roadside	Business & Industry, Oil & Gas
Edinboro State College		May 31, 1968	US 6N at the campus in Edinboro; 41.8788°N 80.11615°W	City	Education
Edinboro State Teachers College		May 31, 1968	PA 99 in front of college, Edinboro (Missing)	City	Education
Erie		November 1, 1946	US 20, west of Erie	Roadside	Cities & Towns, Early Settlement, Forts, Military
Erie		November 1, 1946	US 20, east of Erie	Roadside	Cities & Towns, Forts, Military, War of 1812
Erie		November 1, 1946	US 19, south of Erie; 42.04369°N 80.0745°W	Roadside	Cities & Towns, Forts, Military, War of 1812
Erie County		August 21, 1981	County Courthouse, West 6th Street between Peach and Sassafras Streets, Erie	City	Government & Politics, Government & Politics 19th Century, Military, Native American
Erie Extension Canal		April 30, 1948	PA 18 at Platea; 41.95135°N 80.3291°W	Roadside	Canals, Navigation, Transportation
Erie Extension Canal		April 30, 1948	US 20 at Asbury Road, Millcreek Township; 42.07158°N 80.18237°W	Roadside	Canals, Navigation, Transportation
Erie Land Lighthouse		June 19, 2004	At the site of the lighthouse, 2 Lighthouse Street, Erie	City	Buildings, Navigation
Flagship Niagara		1948	At property on State Street, Erie	Roadside	Military, War of 1812
Fort Le Boeuf (Plaque)		August 1, 1922	US 19, opposite Fort Le Boeuf Museum, Waterford; 41.94008°N 79.98297°W	Plaque	Forts, French & Indian War, George Washington, Military
Fort LeBoeuf		November 1, 1946	US 19 in Waterford; 41.94015°N 79.98262°W	Roadside	Forts, French & Indian War, Military, Native American
Fort LeBoeuf Memorial		September 19, 1951	Property on US 19, Waterford; 41.94037°N 79.98275°W	Roadside	Forts, French & Indian War, George Washington, Military
Fort Presque Isle		October 1, 1946	6th and Parade Streets, Erie; 42.1326°N 80.07692°W	Roadside	Forts, French & Indian War, Military, Native American, Roads
French Creek		November 1, 1946	US 19, slightly north of US 6, south of Waterford; 41.88482°N 79.99943°W	Roadside	Early Settlement, Ethnic & Immigration, George Washington, Transportation
George Washington		November 1, 1946	US 19, at George Washington Memorial Park, Waterford; 41.94007°N 79.98282°W	Roadside	French & Indian War, George Washington, Government & Politics, Government & Politics 18th Century, Military
Harry Kellar (1849–1922)		May 9, 2008	Griswold Park, south side of West 13th Street, between Peach and Sassafras Streets, Erie	Roadside	Performers, Professions & Vocations
Harry T. Burleigh		February 21, 1952	East 6th Street, Erie	Roadside	African American, Music & Theater, Performers
Ida M. Tarbell		September 28, 1950	PA 8 near Hatch Hollow Road, southwest of Wattsburg; 41.9641°N 79.85165°W	Roadside	Abraham Lincoln, Oil & Gas, Women, Writers
John Nelson (1917–1959)		September 18, 2004	3923 Main Street, Lawrence Park Township	City	Civil Rights, Government & Politics 20th Century, Labor
Joshua M. Merrill (1828–1904)		July 24, 2004	Between 19 and 37 North Center Street, Corry	Roadside	Invention, Oil & Gas, Professions & Vocations
LP Gas Industry		May 17, 1962	US 19 at square in Waterford (Missing)	Roadside	Business & Industry, Oil & Gas
Old Custom House		November 1, 1946	State Street, Erie (Missing)	Roadside	Buildings, Business & Industry, Houses & Homesteads
Old French Road		November 1, 1946	Old French Road, south of Erie; 42.09218°N 80.05717°W	Roadside	Native American, Paths & Trails, Roads, Transportation
Old State Line		November 1946	PA 99 at McKean	Roadside	Government & Politics, Government & Politics 18th Century
Old State Line		November 1, 1946	West Lake Road at Happy Valley Road, Springfield Township; 41.99983°N 80.40553°W	Roadside	Government & Politics, Government & Politics 18th Century
Old State Line		November 1, 1946	Main Street at Wattsburg; 41.99925°N 79.81098°W	Roadside	Government & Politics, Government & Politics 18th Century
Old State Line		November 1946	US 19, Waterford	Roadside	Government & Politics, Government & Politics 18th Century
Old State Line		November 1946	US 20 at Girard	Roadside	Government & Politics, Government & Politics 18th Century
Otto Maya		August 17, 2002	10th and State Streets, Erie (Missing)	Roadside	Sports
Paul Allman Siple (1908–1968)		October 14, 2007	Plaza at Erie Maritime Museum, 150 East Front Street, Erie	Roadside	Exploration, Invention, Professions & Vocations
Pennsylvania		April 12, 1949	PA 5, at the Pennsylvania–Ohio border (Missing)	Roadside	Government & Politics, Government & Politics 17th Century, William Penn
Pennsylvania		April 12, 1949	US 20, at the Pennsylvania–Ohio border 41.9446°N 80.51673°W	Roadside	Government & Politics, Government & Politics 17th Century, William Penn
Pennsylvania		April 12, 1949	At I-90 Welcome Center, just west of Pennsylvania–New York border	Roadside	Government & Politics, Government & Politics 17th Century, William Penn
Perry's Shipyards		November 1946	6th and Cascade Streets, Erie	Roadside	Business & Industry, Military
Presque Isle Portage		November 1, 1946	Peach Street near Lane Road, north of Waterford; 41.98068°N 80.0154°W	Roadside	Native American, Paths & Trails, Roads, Transportation
Sr. Bernard Sheridan		September 26, 2003	Saint Vincent Hospital, 232 West 25th Street, Erie; 42.1108°N 80.0775°W	City	Education, Medicine & Science, Professions & Vocations, Women
St. James A. M. E. Church		1994	East 12th Street at Holland Street in Erie	City	African American, Religion
U.S.S. Wolverine		September 3, 1953	North end of State Street, Erie	City	Civil War, Military

== See also ==
- List of Pennsylvania state historical markers
- National Register of Historic Places listings in Erie County, Pennsylvania
