= Frederick Schneider =

Fred(erick) Schneider may refer to:

- Fred Schneider, singer
- Fred B. Schneider, computer scientist
- Frederick Schneider (writer), writer on Seven Mile, Ohio
- Freddy Schneider, actor in Bellisima
- Fred Schneider (Detective Comics 500), fictional character

== See also ==
- Frederick Schneider House
- Friedrich Schneider, composer
