= Villa Maria Academy =

Villa Maria Academy could refer to:

- Villa Maria Academy (Malvern, Pennsylvania), a Catholic high school in Malvern, Pennsylvania
- Villa Maria Academy (Erie, Pennsylvania), a Catholic high school in Erie, Pennsylvania
  - Villa Maria Academy (1892), the original academy buildings for Villa Maria Academy in Erie, Pennsylvania
- Villa Maria Academy, Buffalo, New York; closed in 2006
