= Cashier's House =

Historic house in Pennsylvania, United States

- Cashier's House and Coach House
- U.S. National Register of Historic Places
- Pennsylvania state historical marker
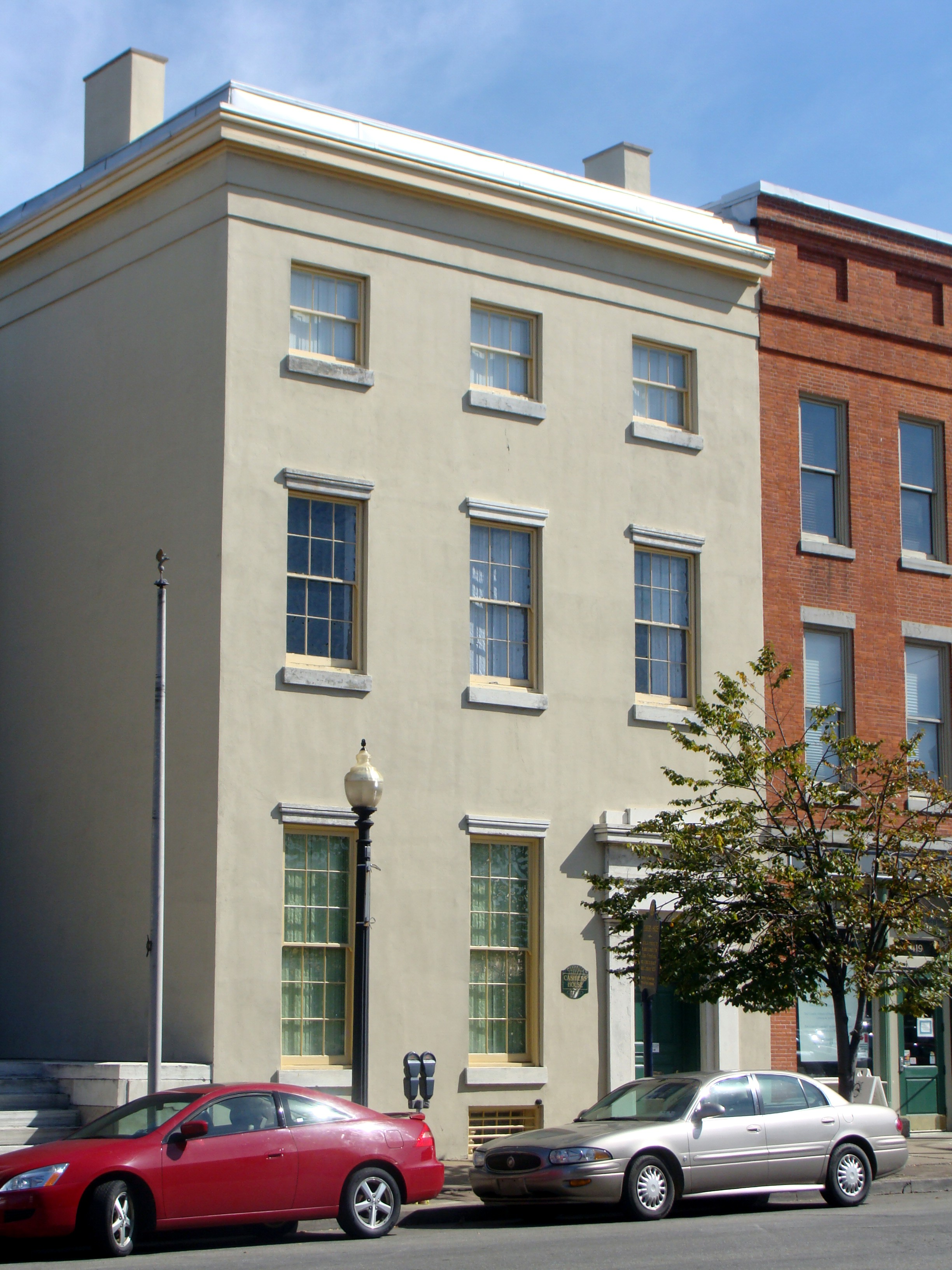

- Location within Pennsylvania
- Location: 413 State Street, Erie, Pennsylvania
- Coordinates: 42°7′48″N 80°5′10″W
- Built: 1839
- Architect: William Kelly
- Architectural style: Egyptian Revival, Greek Revival
- NRHP reference No.: 72001121 (original); 83002241 (increase)

Significant dates
- Added to NRHP: January 13, 1972
- Boundary increase: March 9, 1983
- Designated PHMC: 1980

The Cashier's House is a three-story stuccoed-brick, Greek Revival building located on State Street in Erie, Pennsylvania. It was documented by the Historic American Buildings Survey in 1934. The house was listed on the National Register of Historic Places on January 13, 1972, and its boundary was increased on March 9, 1983.

== History ==
The Cashier's House was designed by the Philadelphia architect William Kelly, and was built in 1839 as part of a complex; the other components of the development were the Coach House and the Old Custom House. The Cashier's House was built primarily as the residence for the chief executive officer of the next door Erie Branch of the Bank of the United States. The bank closed in 1841, but the cashier of the bank continued to live in the house until his death in 1843. In 1850, the house was sold for $4,000 ($138,214 in present-day terms) at half of its original cost. The Cashier's House was bought by Samuel Woodruff in 1872. The Woodruffs occupied the Cashier's House until 1913, leading the house to sometimes be referred to as the "Woodruff Residence" or "Woodruff House."

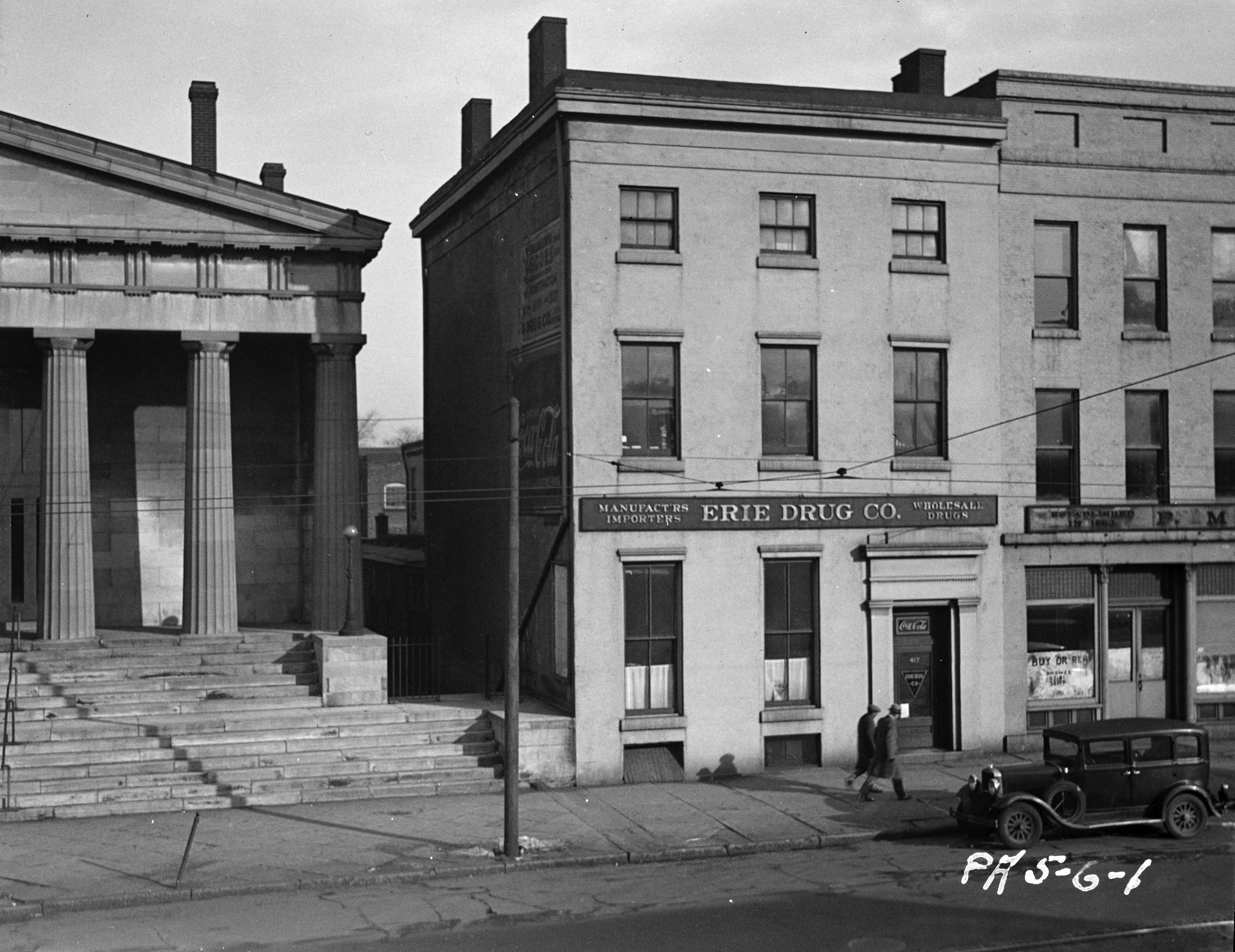
HABS photo of Cashier's House, next to the Old Custom House, in 1934

The state of Pennsylvania bought the Cashier's House on July 17, 1963, for $30,800 ($323,902 today). The state restored the Cashier's House, and the next-door Old Custom House, in the late 1960s and early 1970s. On March 9, 1983, the boundary of the site—as defined by the National Register—was increased to include the Coach House. On March 12, 2013, ownership of the Cashier's House and the adjacent Old Custom House was transferred by the Pennsylvania Historical & Museum Commission to the Erie Art Museum, which has occupied the Custom House since October 1983.

=== Coach House ===
The Coach House, located on East 4th Street, was built at the same time of the Old Custom House and the Cashier's House. The house was sold to a marble dealer in 1882 and was sold, again, in 1904 to a blacksmith. The depth of the house was expanded to nearly triple the original size by the blacksmith to house heavy machinery.

== Design ==
The Cashier's House is 30 feet 2 inches (9.19 m) wide and 125 feet 5 inches (38.23 m) deep. Both the exteriors of the Cashier's and Coach Houses are Greek Revival. The interior of the Cashier's House is a rare example of Egyptian Revival architecture in Pennsylvania.

== See also ==
- National Register of Historic Places listings in Erie County, Pennsylvania
