= Federal Row =

Historic houses in Pennsylvania, United States

- U.S. National Register of Historic Places
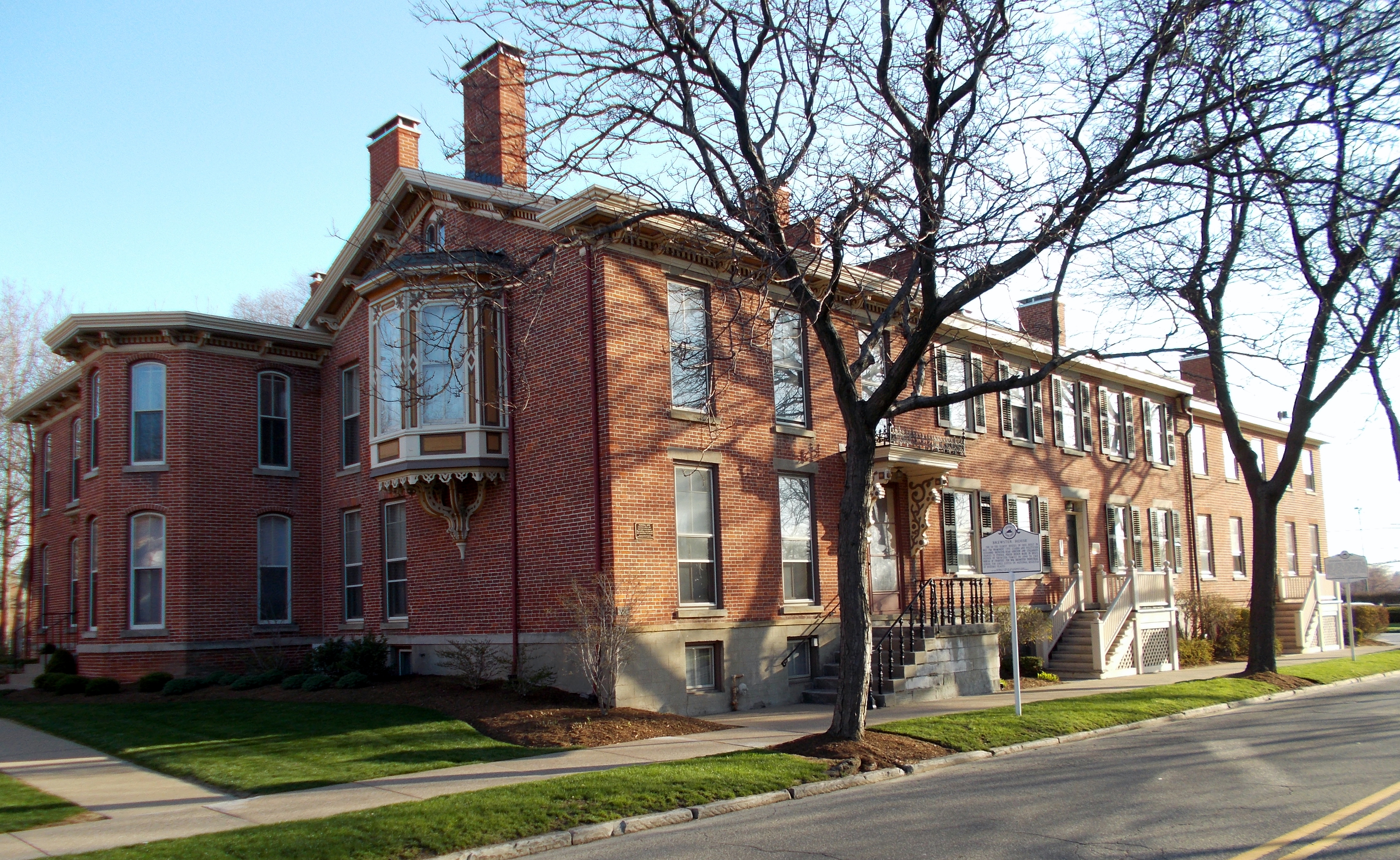
- Federal Row—looking east, April 2013

- Location within Pennsylvania Location within the United States
- Location: 146–162 E. 5th St.; 424–430 Holland St., Erie, Pennsylvania
- Coordinates: 42°7′55″N 80°04′57″W
- Area: 0.7 acres (0.28 ha)
- Built: 1823–1842
- Built by: David Kennedy
- Architectural style: Federal, Greek Revival
- NRHP reference No.: 84003355
- Added to NRHP: May 17, 1984

Federal Row consists of five historic residential buildings located at Erie, Erie County, Pennsylvania. They are the Charles M. Tibbals House (1842), the Alexander Brewster House (1823), the Kennedy Row House (1836), the David Kennedy House (1832), and the Kennedy Double House (1840). They are characterized as rectangular brick dwellings, 2 to 2 1/2 stories tall, with gently sloping roofs. They have design elements characteristic of the Federal and Greek Revival styles.

It was added to the National Register of Historic Places in 1987.

== Gallery ==
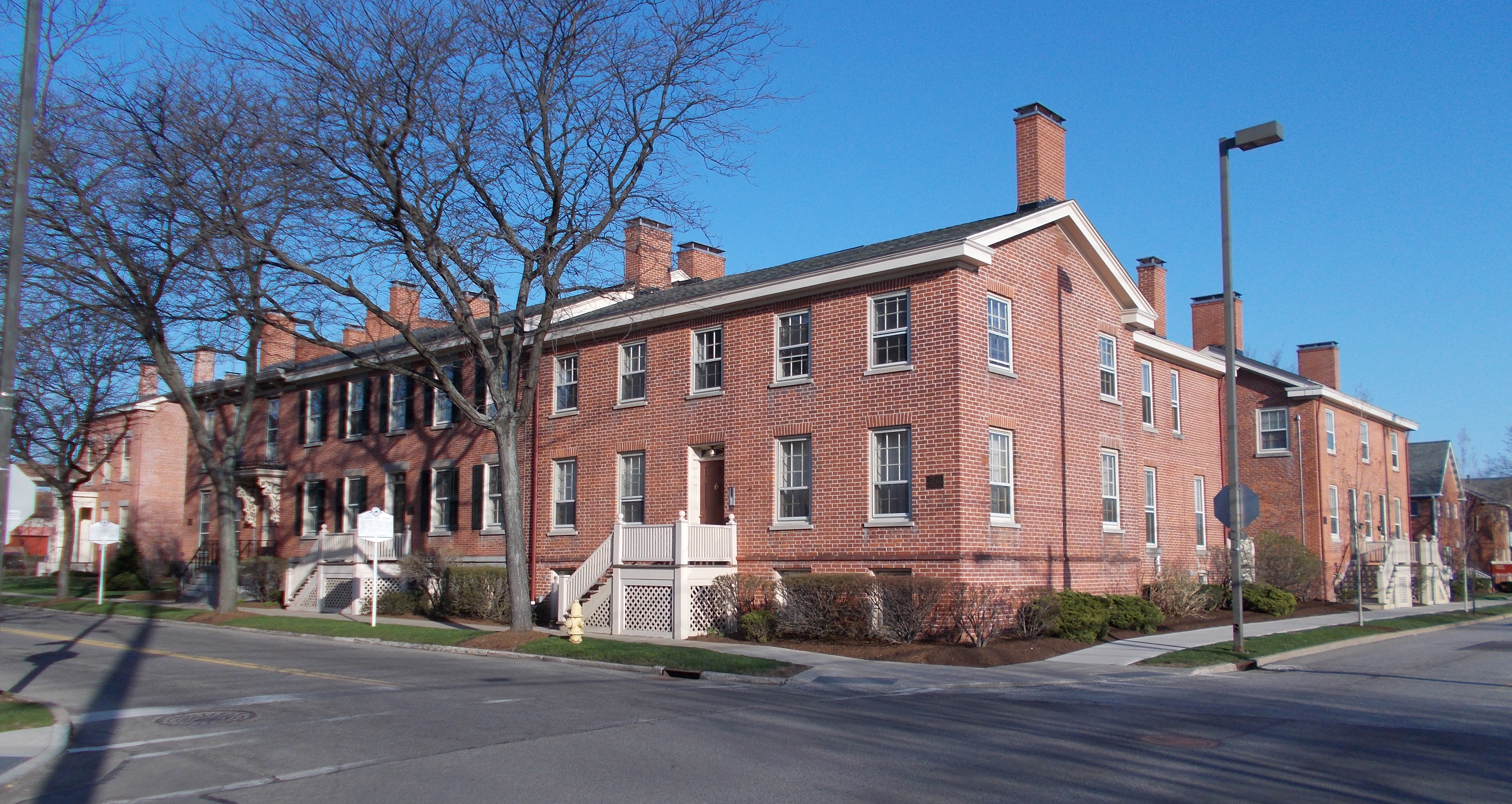
Federal Row—looking west, Erie, Pennsylvania, April 2013

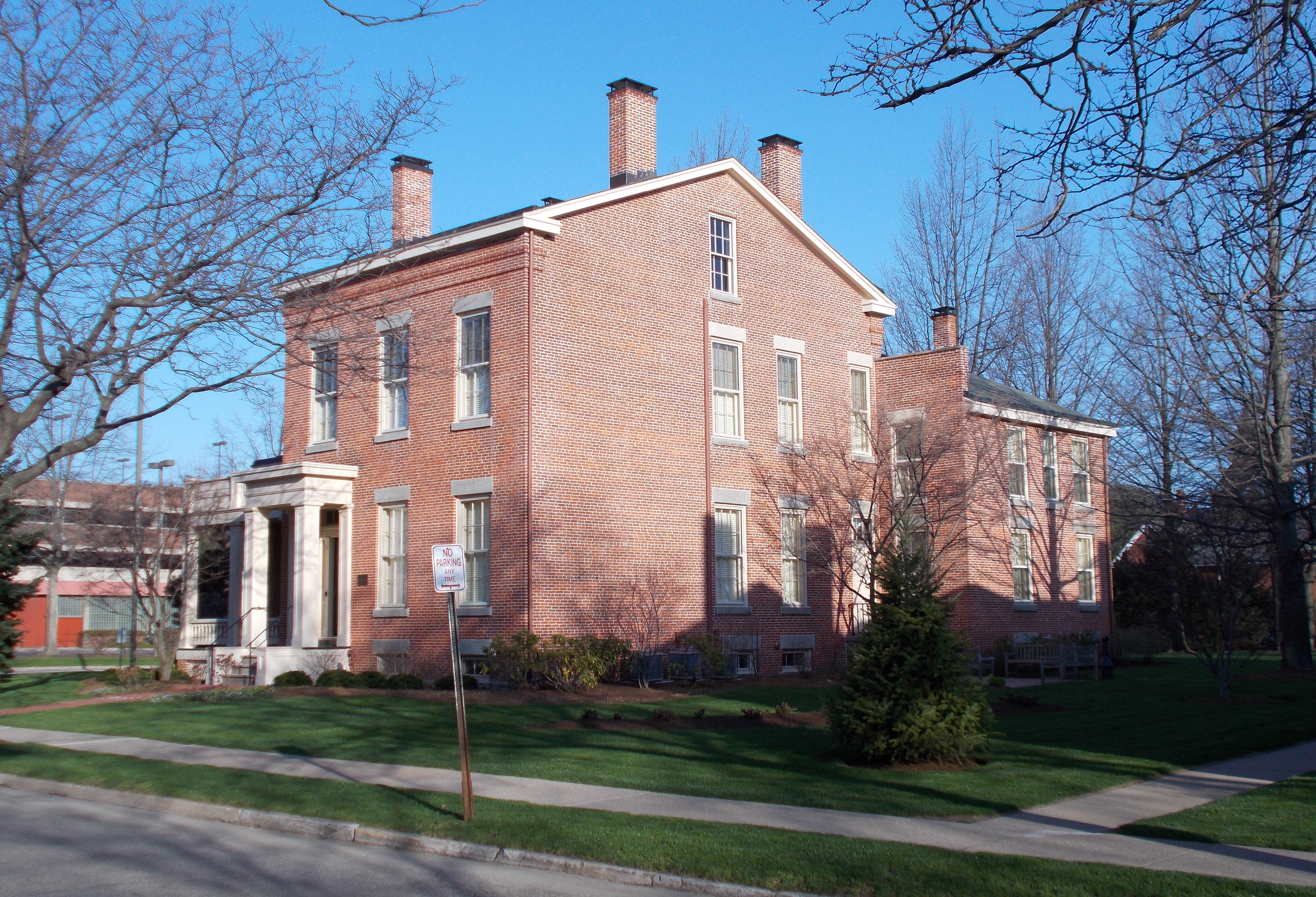
Tibbals House, Federal Row, April 2013
