= USS Niagara (1813) =

US Navy wooden-hulled snow-brig

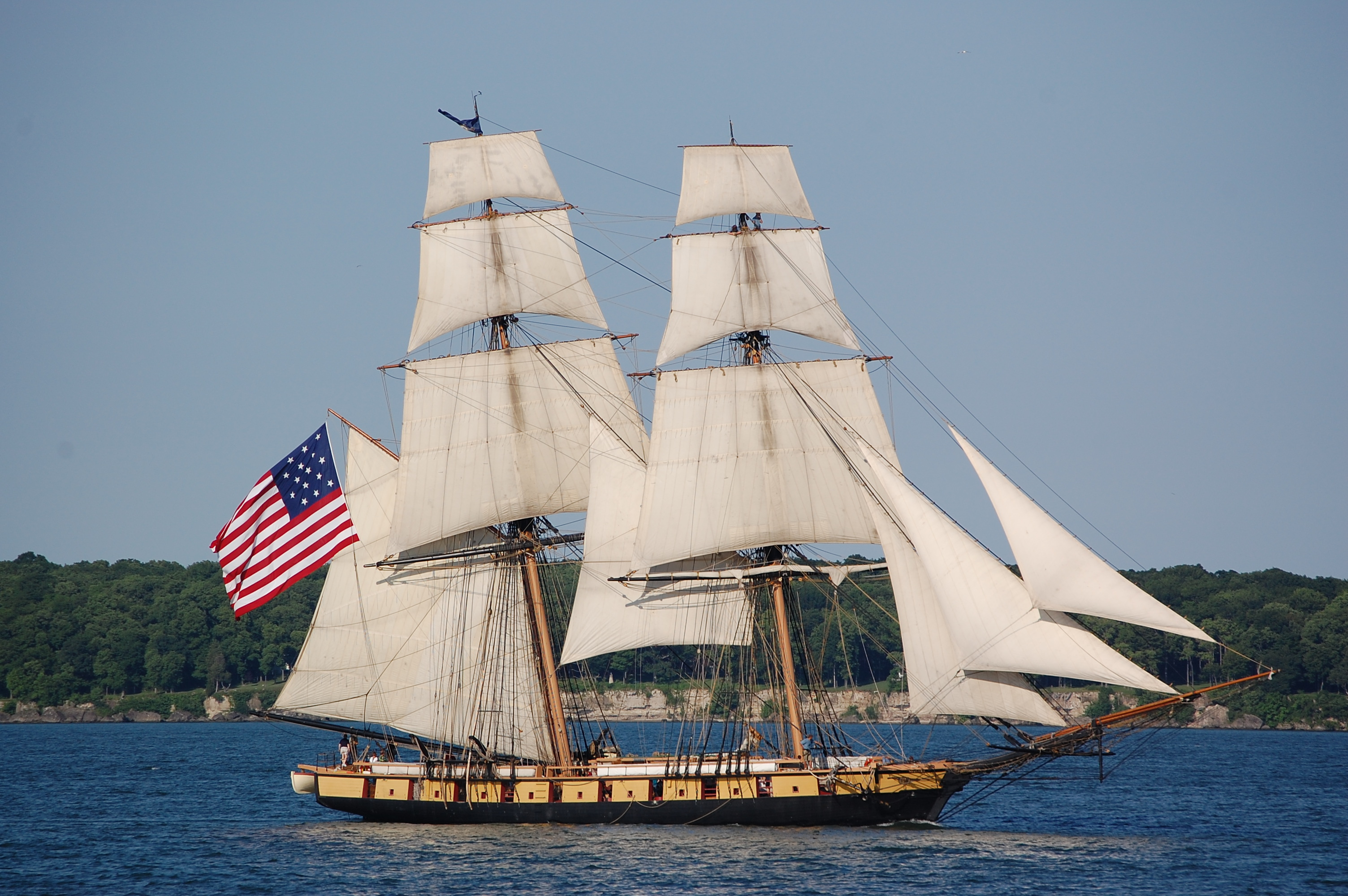
- US Brig Niagara near Put-in-Bay, Ohio in June 2009

History

United States
- Name: Niagara
- Owner: Pennsylvania Historical and Museum Commission
- Ordered: 31 December 1812
- Launched: 13 June 1813; 213 years ago
- Sunk: 1820
- Raised: 6 March 1913
- Restored: 1913, 1931–1943, 1963, 1988
- In service: In service
- Home port: Erie, Pennsylvania
- Status: Museum ship

General characteristics
- Class & type: Niagara-class snow-brig
- Displacement: 297 long tons (302 t)
- Length: 110 ft 8 in (33.7 m) LBP
- Beam: 32 ft (9.8 m)
- Height: 113 ft 4 in (34.5 m) Foremast; 118 ft 4 in (36.1 m) Mainmast
- Depth: 9 ft (2.7 m)
- Sail plan: 12,665 sq ft (1,177 m^{2}) on two masts
- Boats & landing craft carried: 2 cutters, 1 yawl

1813:
- Tons burthen: 492 60/95 tons
- Complement: 155 officers and enlisted
- Armament: 18 × 32-pounder carronades; 2 × 12-pounder long guns

1998:
- Tonnage: 162 GT
- Installed power: 2 × 200 bhp (150 kW) diesel engines
- Crew: 20 professional, 20 volunteer
- Armament: 2 × 32-pounder carronades
- U.S.S. Niagara
- U.S. National Register of Historic Places
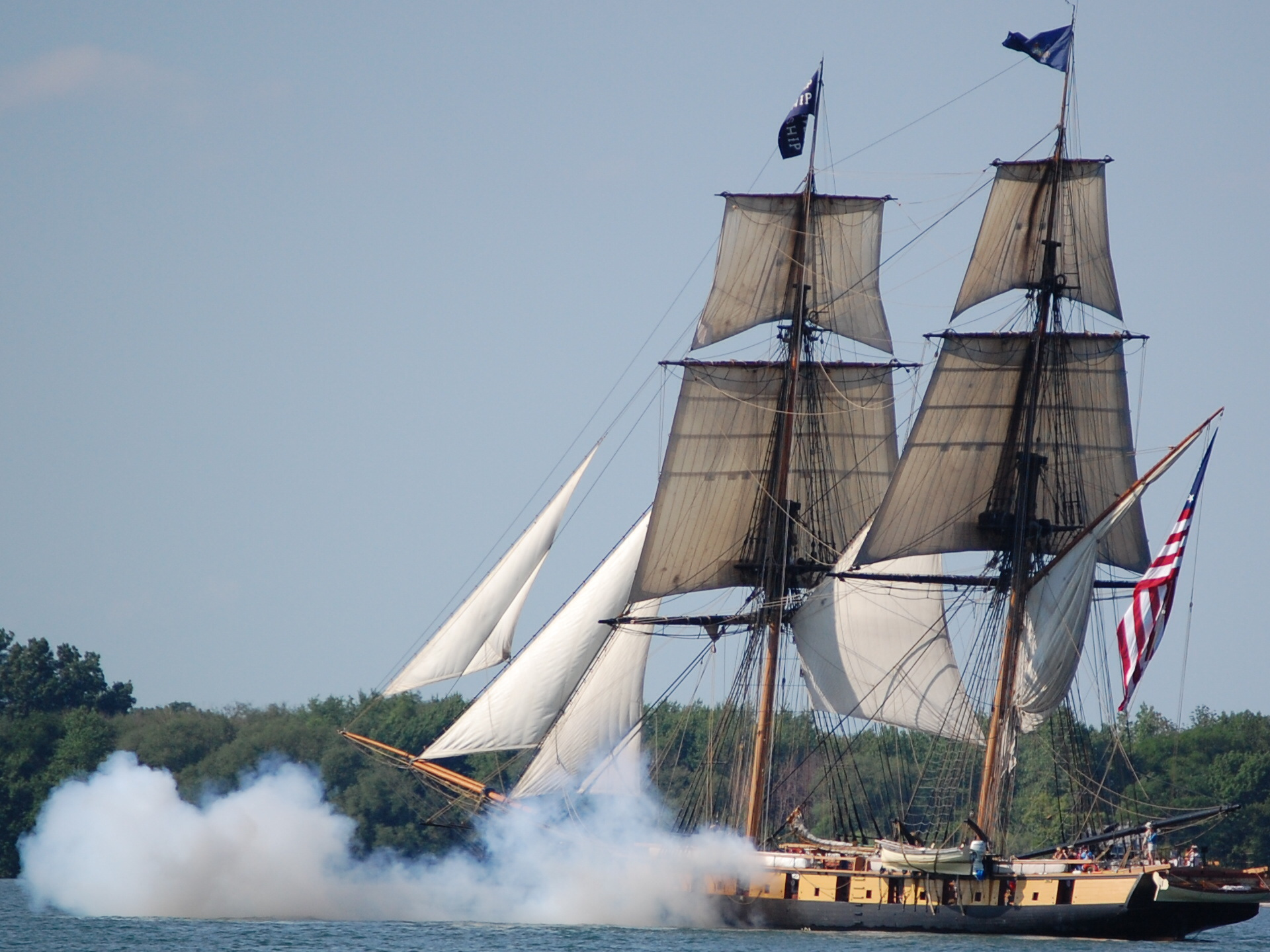
- Brig Niagara firing its cannons, off of Put-in-Bay, Ohio
- Location: Erie, Pennsylvania
- Coordinates: 42.129561°N 80.085214°W
- Area: Less than one acre
- Architectural style: Snow-brig
- NRHP reference No.: 73001628

Significant dates
- Added to NRHP: 11 April 1973
- Designated NRHP: 11 April 1973

USS Niagara, commonly called the U.S. Brig Niagara or the Flagship Niagara, is a wooden-hulled snow-brig^{[b]} that served as the relief flagship for Oliver Hazard Perry in the Battle of Lake Erie during the War of 1812. As the ship is certified for sail training by the United States Coast Guard, she is also designated SSV Niagara. Niagara is usually docked behind the Erie Maritime Museum in downtown Erie in the U.S. state of Pennsylvania as an outdoor exhibit for the museum. She also often travels the Great Lakes during the summer, serving as an ambassador of Pennsylvania when not docked. It was listed on the National Register of Historic Places in 1973 and was designated the official state ship of Pennsylvania by the Pennsylvania General Assembly in 1988.

Niagara was constructed from 1812 to 1813 to protect the vulnerable American coastline on Lake Erie from the British and played a pivotal role in the battle for the lake. Along with most warships that served in the war, Niagara was sunk for preservation on Presque Isle in 1820. Raised in 1913, it was rebuilt for the centennial of the Battle of Lake Erie. After deteriorating, the restoration of Niagara was started again in the 1930s, but was hampered by the lack of funds caused by the Great Depression and remained uncompleted until 1963. A more extensive restoration was carried out in 1988 in which much of the original ship was largely destroyed. The incorporation of new materials and modern equipment makes it ambiguous as to whether it is or is not a replica.

== Naming ==
In 1907, President Theodore Roosevelt issued an executive order standardizing the prefix of all vessels of the United States Navy to be "USS". Prior to this, ship prefixes were used "haphazardly", but ships' names were often preceded by the abbreviation "US" and the type of vessel. A survey of documents contained in the National Archives and Records Administration that were sent to and from the Department of the Navy in that era found a number of inconsistencies. Of 55 correspondences that mentioned Niagara, 43.6 percent used the term "US Sloop Niagara", 32.7 percent used "US Brig Niagara" and 23.6 percent had "USS Niagara".

Because of its historical role as the flagship of Oliver Hazard Perry during the Battle of Lake Erie, the ship is commonly referred to as the Flagship Niagara. Niagara also carries the name of "SSV Niagara" due to its designation by the United States Coast Guard as a Sailing School Vessel.^{[a]}

== Construction ==
In the beginning of September 1812, Daniel Dobbins, a merchant on the Great Lakes, arrived in Washington, D.C., to warn the United States government of the vulnerability of the Lake Erie coastline to a British attack. Dobbins had been captured by the British after a surprise attack at Fort Mackinac in Michigan, but was able to negotiate his release. Dobbins was briefly detained again by the British in Detroit after the city was captured. After several days of discussions with President James Madison and Secretary of the Navy Paul Hamilton, Dobbins convinced them that the safest place to build a fleet was in the sheltered bay formed by Presque Isle at Erie, Pennsylvania. On 15 September, Hamilton authorized Dobbins to construct four gunboats. Hamilton also granted $2,000 to be used for the construction and appointed Dobbins, a civilian, to the rank of sailing master in the United States Navy. On 31 December, Captain Isaac Chauncey, the commander of naval forces on Lake Ontario, arrived in Erie for a day, made some alterations to Dobbins' ship design and authorized him to build, additionally, two brigs. Oliver Hazard Perry was named chief naval officer in February 1813 and was given orders to report to Erie from Newport, Rhode Island. Perry arrived in Erie on 26 March, after being held up in Sackets Harbor, New York for two weeks by Chauncey in case of a possible attack by the British.

The construction of the fleet was largely supervised by Noah Brown, a shipwright brought in from New York City. The keels of two brigs were each constructed out of a single 14-by-18-inch (360 mm × 460 mm) black oak log. Due to a lack of iron, the timbers that made up the hulls were joined using wooden pins called treenails. In place of the oakum and pitch normally used to caulk ships, lead was used. The timbers used in the brigs were still green, as the builders did not have the luxury of time to allow the wood to dry properly. A total of 65 cannons were shipped to Erie to arm the fleet; Hamilton approved the production of 37 cannons by a foundry in Washington, D.C., and the rest were moved from Sackets Harbor. Tigress and Porcupine were launched in April 1813, Scorpion in May, and the brig Lawrence on 25 June. Niagara was launched on 4 July along with Ariel.

One of the strategic advantages of building a fleet in Erie was that the bay formed by Presque Isle was cut off from the Lake Erie by a sandbar, which prevented British warships from being able to enter the bay. The brigs Niagara and Lawrence both had a draft of 9 feet (2.7 m), which was too deep to cross the sandbar. On 4 August, Niagara was pulled onto the sandbar using its anchor in a technique called kedging and was lightened by removing its cannons and ballast. A pair of 90-by-40-foot (27 by 12 m) barges, called "camels", were placed on either side of the ship. The camels were sunk and secured to Niagara. The water was pumped out of the camel, lifting the ship. By the following day, Niagara was safely over the sandbar and was rearmed; Lawrence was floated over the sandbar a couple of days before Niagara. During the construction, the area was usually under daily surveillance by the British. On the day Lawrence crossed the sandbar, a pair of British warships, Queen Charlotte and Lady Prevost, observed for an hour but failed to notice Perry's actions.

== War of 1812 ==
On 6 August, Perry ordered a shakedown cruise of his squadron, now totaling ten after the inclusion of three merchant vessels—Somers, Trippe and Ohio—that were converted into warships and Caledonia, which was captured from the British. Lieutenant Daniel Turner was placed in command of Niagara for the cruise, as the squadron was still seriously undermanned; Dobbins had even written a letter, directed to Secretary Hamilton, out of desperation back in December 1812. Word arrived on 8 August that Jesse Elliott was en route to Erie from Black Rock, New York with 89 men. Elliott was promoted to Master Commandant in July, and was given command of Niagara after arriving in Erie on 10 August.

On 17 August, Perry's squadron anchored off of Sandusky, Ohio, and dispatched a boat to inform General William Henry Harrison of their presence. Harrison and his staff met with Perry aboard the ships the next day and agreed to a rendezvous in Put-in-Bay. In Put-in-Bay, Harrison made available 100 "Kentucky and frontier riflemen" to serve on board as Marines. A British squadron, under the command of Commodore Robert Heriot Barclay, was based at Fort Amherstburg, Canada. While Perry's squadron was under construction, Barclay had ordered the construction of HMS Detroit, which was to be a match for Niagara and Lawrence. Unbeknownst to Perry, supplies in Fort Amherstburg were running out, as his squadron had cut off shipments from Long Point. Fearing an uprising caused by a shortage of food, Barclay and his squadron set sail as soon as Detroit was complete.

=== Battle of Lake Erie ===
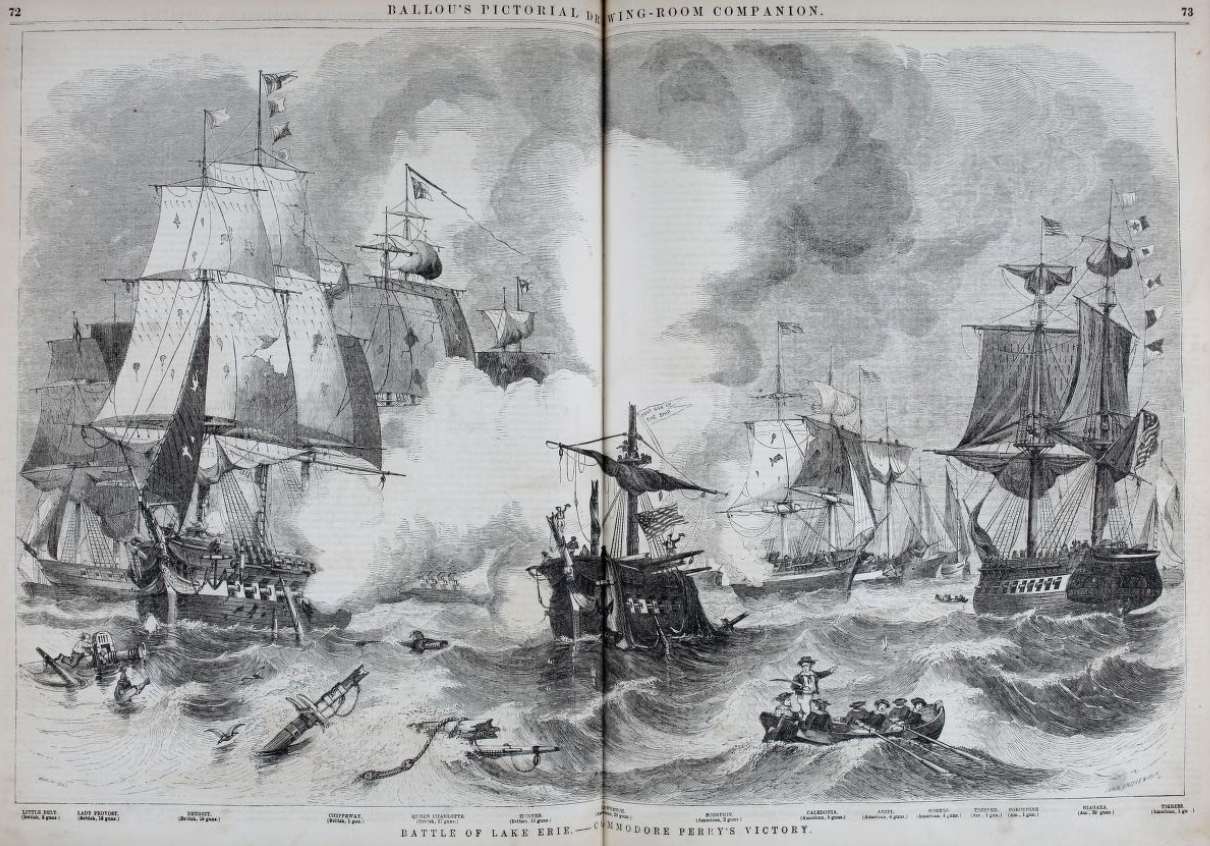
Battle of Lake Erie, Ballou's Pictorial 1856

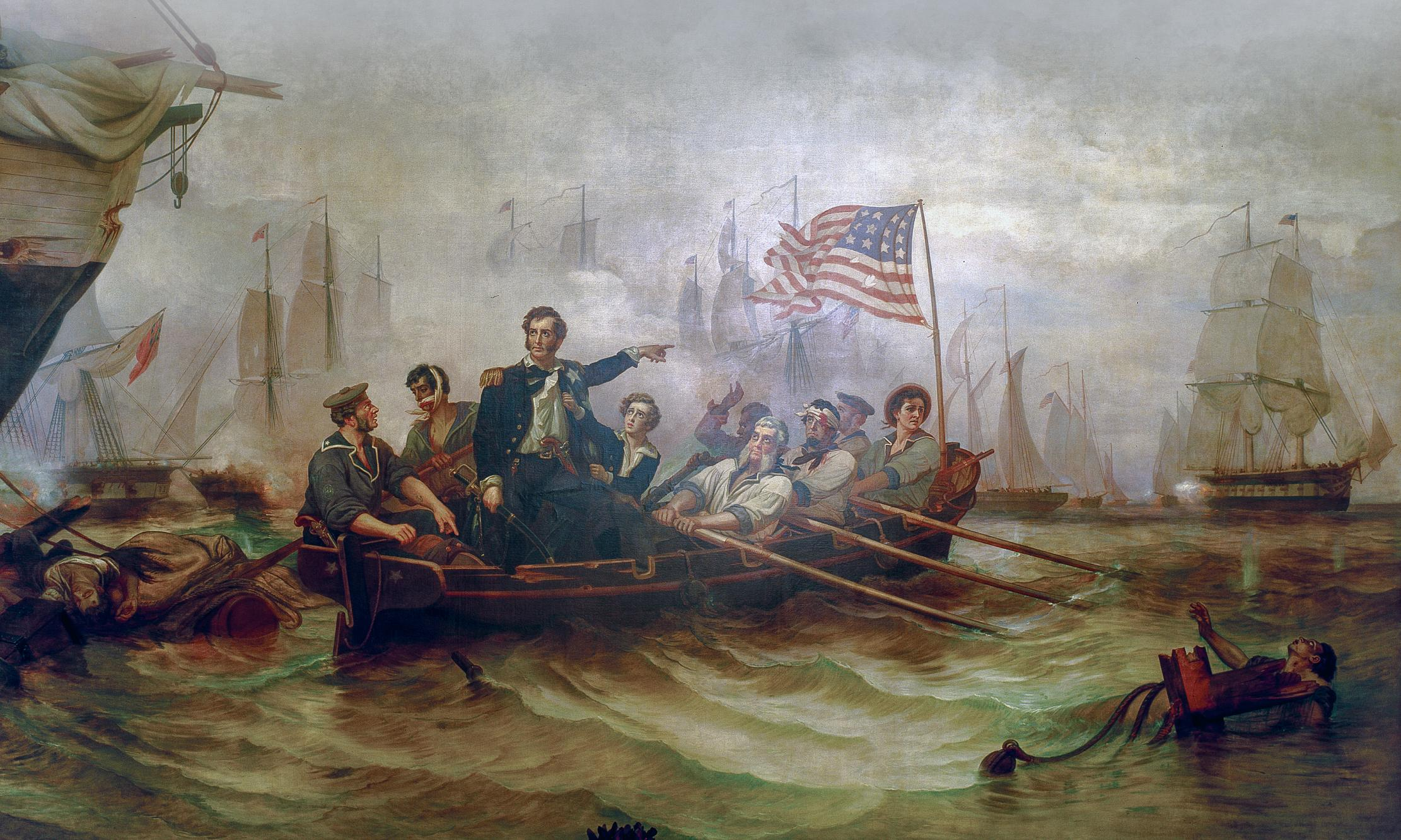
Painting by William Henry Powell depicting Perry's transfer to Niagara during the Battle of Lake Erie.

On 10 September, both squadrons got underway. Detroit fired the first shot around noon, while still out of range. Perry formed his ships into a line of battle, with the larger ships each being assigned a target: Lawrence to Detroit, Niagara to Queen Charlotte, and Caledonia to Hunter. As the line moved to engage, Niagara, under the command of Elliott, lagged behind the rest of the American squadron. The cause of the failure of Niagara to maintain formation is unknown, either deliberate on the part of Elliott, or because it was becalmed. After a couple of hours, all of the cannons on Lawrence that were facing the British were out of commission and the brig could no longer be maneuvered. Perry lowered his battle flag, emblazoned with the last words of Captain James Lawrence, "DONT [sic] GIVE UP THE SHIP" and transferred to the still-intact Niagara via a dinghy. Perry took command of Niagara and crossed the British line perpendicularly in a tactic called crossing the "T". Queen Charlotte, while attempting to prevent Niagara from breaking through the line, collided with Detroit and became entangled. Niagara opened fire with both broadsides: the starboard broadside hitting Queen Charlotte and Detroit, and the port into Lady Prevost. After several broadsides, Queen Charlotte struck her colours, followed shortly after by Detroit and the rest of Barclay's squadron.

Following the battle, Niagara assisted in the transporting of Harrison's army to the mouth of the Detroit River in preparation for an invasion of southwest Ontario. On 25 April 1814, command of Niagara was transferred to Arthur Sinclair. After repairs, the squadron—consisting of Niagara, Lawrence, Caledonia, Scorpion and Tigress—departed Erie for Detroit. In Detroit, soldiers under the command of Colonel George Croghan embarked with the squadron, bound for Mackinac Island. The squadron arrived on 26 July and landed on 4 August. The battle was ultimately lost, with Croghan being forced to retreat back to his boats. On 13 August, the squadron arrived at the mouth of the Nottawasaga River where they attacked a blockhouse owned by the North West Company (NWC). The NWC blockhouse was destroyed by the British, along with the schooner HMS Nancy, to prevent the supplies they contained from being captured.

After the Treaty of Ghent was signed, ending the war, the majority of the surviving ships that participated in the Battle of Lake Erie were disposed of in 1815. Queen Charlotte, Detroit, and Lawrence were sunk for preservation in Misery Bay on Presque Isle, whereas Niagara was kept afloat and operated as a receiving ship. It was sunk in 1820 when the naval station at Presque Isle was closed. Benjamin H. Brown of Rochester, New York bought all four ships in 1825, but sold them in 1836 to George Miles of Erie. Miles raised the ships, planning on using them as merchant vessels. Lawrence and Niagara, not having a large enough hold and being in poor condition, were allowed to sink again.

== Centennial ==
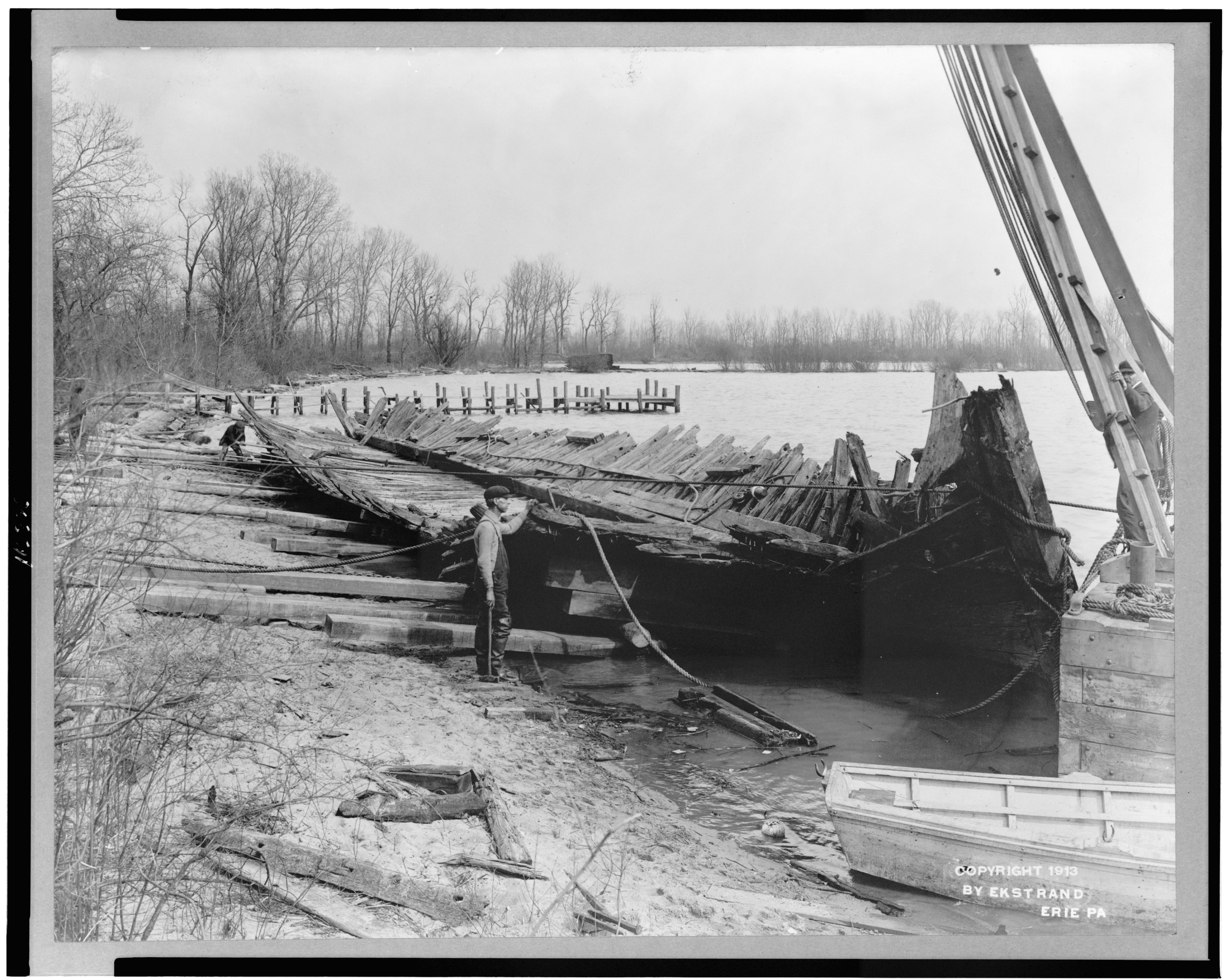
Uncovered remains of Niagara at the water's edge

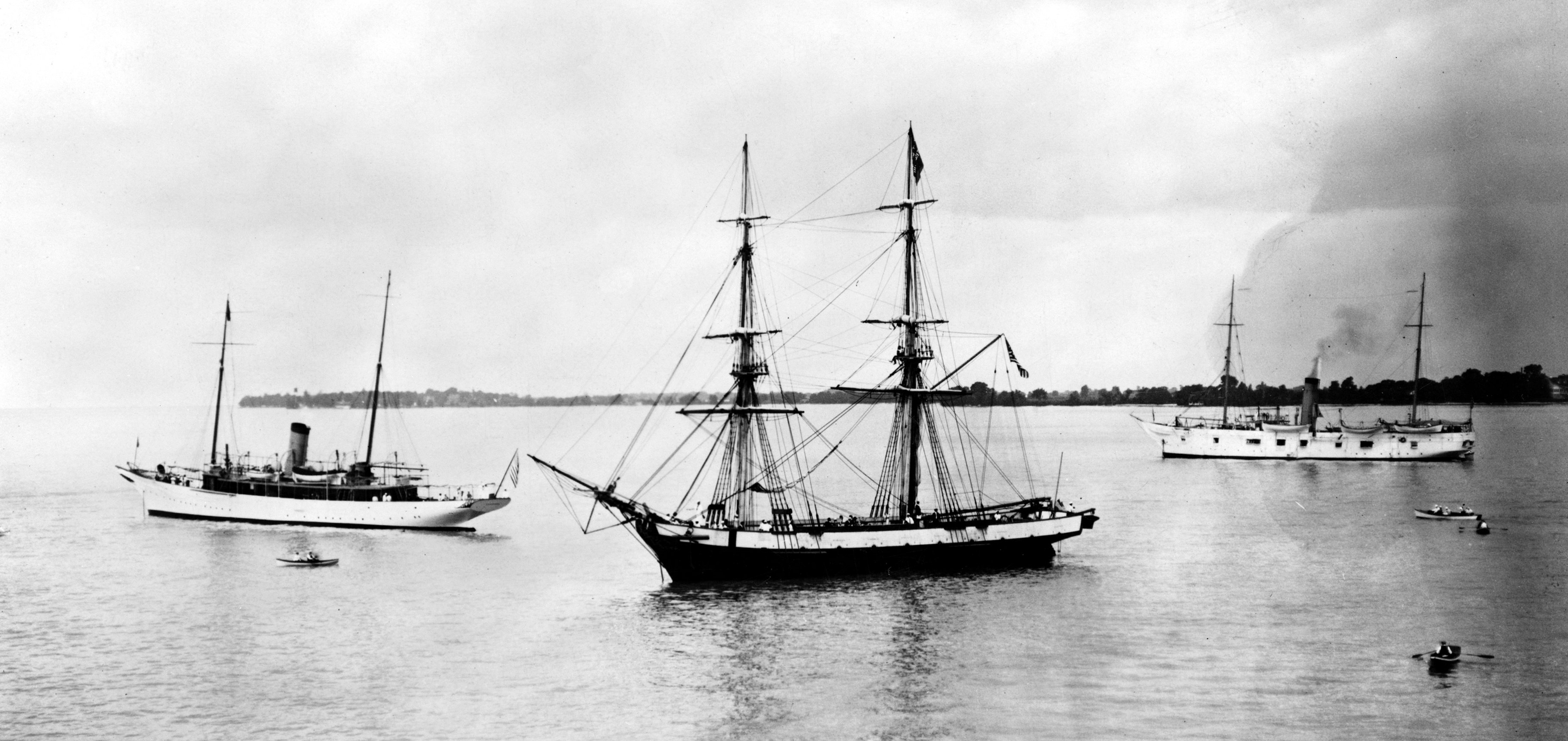
Niagara at Put-in-Bay, Ohio for the centennial of the Battle of Lake Erie in 1913.

As part of celebrations for the centennial of the Battle of Lake Erie, Niagara was raised from Misery Bay in April 1913. Its keel was found to be in good enough condition for the brig to be rebuilt. Efforts to rebuild Niagara were hampered by the lack of original plans. The restored Niagara was launched on 7 June, complete with a new bowsprit, rigging and reproduction cannons supplied by the Boston Navy Yard. From mid-July to mid-September, Niagara was towed to various ports on the Great Lakes—including Milwaukee, Chicago, Detroit, Buffalo and Cleveland—by USS Wolverine, the Navy's first iron-hulled warship. Ownership of Niagara was transferred to the City of Erie in 1917, where it remained docked and deteriorating.

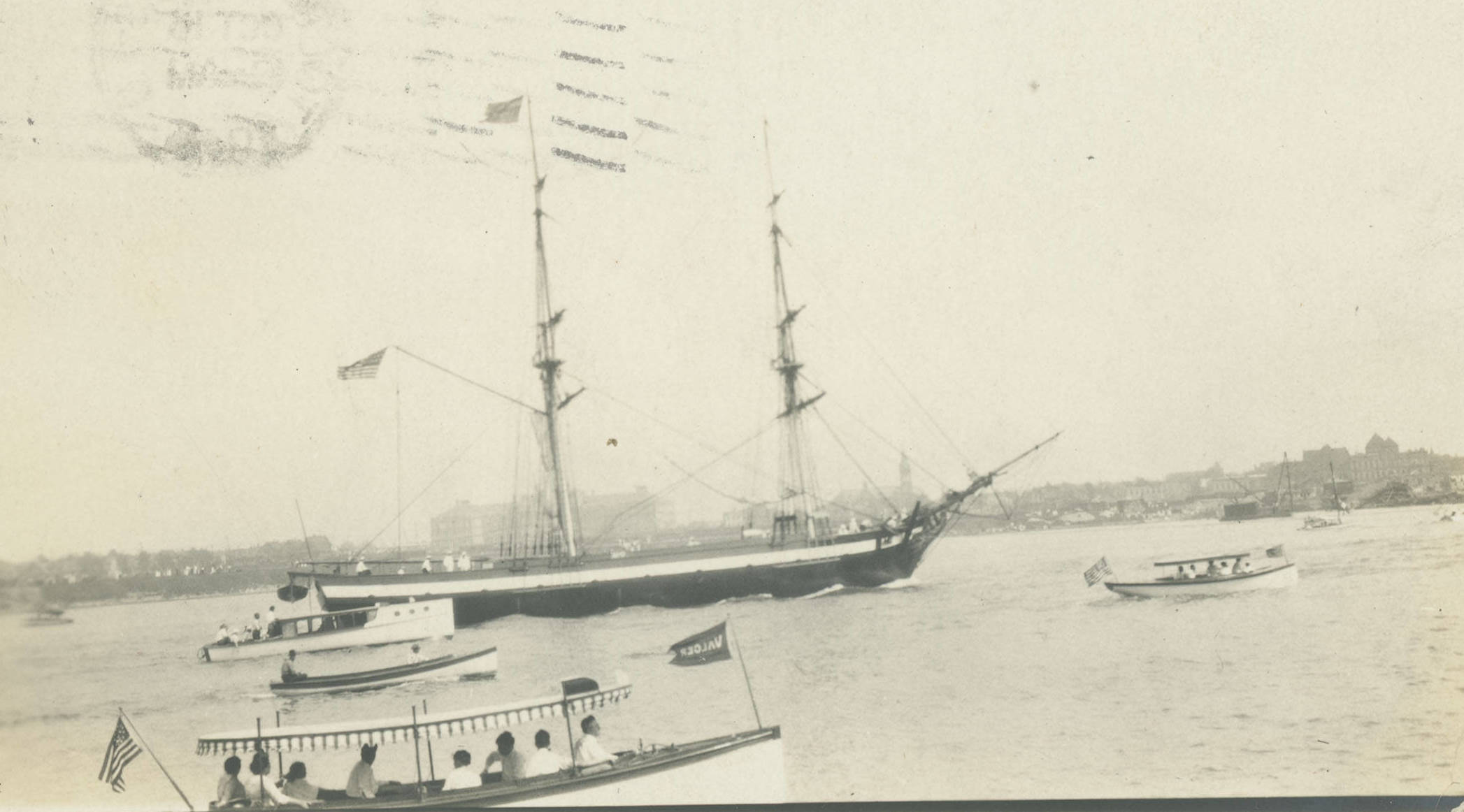
Flagship Niagara coming up the Maumee River, Toledo, Ohio, 1913

The City of Erie transferred ownership of Niagara to the newly formed "USS Niagara Foundation" in 1929, which was tasked with "acquiring and restoring the ship and making it the centerpiece of a museum." The onset of the Great Depression forced the Commonwealth of Pennsylvania to take ownership, through the Flagship Niagara Commission, two years later. $50,000 was made available for another restoration in 1931, but by 1938 the state stopped its funding, leaving the restoration unfinished. Niagara was transferred to the Pennsylvania Historical Commission, predecessor of the Pennsylvania Historical and Museum Commission, and became a project for the Works Progress Administration. The Historical Commission contracted Howard I. Chapelle to draw up plans for another restoration of Niagara, based on other period ships that were built by Noah Brown, like Saratoga. According to Chapelle, very little of the original Niagara remained, as parts of it had been sold as souvenirs, and the 1913 reconstruction was not accurate to the period. The hull of Niagara was launched in October 1943 without any masts, spars, or rigging. It was placed in a concrete cradle in 1951. Discovery of dry rot throughout every part of Niagara made it clear that a complete reconstruction would eventually be needed. Funds were appropriated by the Pennsylvania Historical and Museum Commission to make Niagara "presentable" for the sesquicentennial of the Battle of Lake Erie in 1963 with the addition of rigging and cannons. Niagara was listed on the National Register of Historic Places on 11 April 1973.

== Museum ship ==
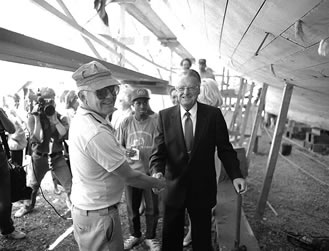
Erie mayor Louis J. Tullio (right) congratulating Melbourne Smith (left) on the reconstruction of Niagara.

In 1981, the Flagship Niagara League was formed with intent of reconstructing Niagara so that it would be a working ship, instead of an "outdoor museum piece". The League was eventually incorporated as a non-profit organization associated with the Pennsylvania Historical and Museum Commission. Melbourne Smith, builder of the schooner Pride of Baltimore, was hired in 1986 by the Pennsylvania Historical and Museum Commission to head the reconstruction. The decay of Niagara was so bad that it was dismantled and ultimately destroyed, with various timbers salvaged and used in non-structural areas of the ship. The destruction of the old ship and use of new wood often leads Niagara to be considered a replica. While the first Niagara was built hurriedly, the new Niagara was built out of properly seasoned and preserved yellow pine and Douglas fir. The new Niagara was launched on 10 September 1988, but was not completed until 18 July 1990 when its sea trials were held. The Pennsylvania General Assembly designated Niagara as the official flagship of Pennsylvania on 29 April 1988 and described its purpose as being a "sailing ambassador for Pennsylvania". In March 2008, the yellow pine mainmast was replaced with one of Douglas fir.

The United States Coast Guard certified Niagara as a Sailing School Vessel in August 2005. For safety reasons, Niagara was equipped with modern equipment such as auxiliary diesel engines, lifeboats, radar, LORAN and radio. In 2009, the Flagship Niagara League assumed day-to-day management of Niagara after a decision by the Pennsylvania Historical and Museum Commission to cut $250,000 to fill a budget deficit. As part of the bicentennial of the Battle of Lake Erie, Niagara took part in a reenactment of the battle on 2 September 2013 in Put-In-Bay along with 16 other tall ships.

On 18 December 2023, the Pennsylvania Historical and Museum Commission announced that they would be ending their relationship with the Flagship Niagara League on 1 January 2024 and would be assuming operational control of Niagara as part of a more museum focused future for the vessel. On 23 April 2024, the United States Coast Guard declared Niagara to be inactive and closed her to the public. In July the Pennsylvania Historical & Museum Commission announced Greg Bailey would become the ship's new captain. The ship would be sailed to Cleveland for mechanical work later in 2024, with the Coast Guard allowing the move for repair. The move to Ohio was performed by Ironbound Rigging, who would be criticized by the Flagship Niagara League for sailing the ship with a crew made up of mostly Canadian citizens, in violation of the Merchant Marine Act of 1920, and for the ties between Captain Greg Bailey and Ironbound Rigging's founder. The violation was self reported by a member of the Pennsylvania Historical & Museum Commission with the United States Coast Guard issuing a warning, and the commission stated their intent to comply with all maritime regulations going onward.

After building a deck to protect the ship during the 2024 winter, Captain Greg Bailey announced plans to move the ship to New England in 2025 for an extensive refit which would return the vessel to full operational status. The ship arrived in Boothbay Harbor, Maine to Samples Shipyard, owned by Bristol Marine, in June 2025 for retrofit, with the stated goal to return the vessel to Erie by July 2026 to celebrate the United States Semiquincentennial. The ship returned afloat in May 2026, in preparation for its return to its homeport. Captain Greg Bailey announced his resignation due on June 1st, having seen the ship through to restoration, and Captain Richard Bailey (no relation) a veteran from sailing on the HMS Rose (Richard Bailey had captained the Rose during filming of the 2003 film Master & Commander: The Far Side of the World) was announced as interim captain. On June 2, 2026; the ship restoration was declared complete. A controversy arose shortly afterwards when the captain and crew on the ship, were photographed with signal flags displaying the numbers "8647" which was interpreted as a political message against President Donald Trump

== In popular culture ==
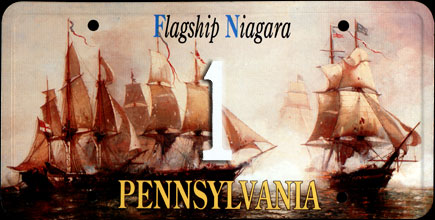
Flagship Niagara license plate

In 1996, a commemorative Pennsylvania license plate was introduced depicting Niagara during the Battle of Lake Erie. Concerns by law enforcement about the plates' legibility led them to be no longer issued.

In 2010, Niagara was used to depict the whaleship Essex in an episode of the Public Broadcasting Service documentary series American Experience.

== See also ==
- List of Pennsylvania state symbols
- National Register of Historic Places listings in Erie County, Pennsylvania

== Notes ==
a. Niagara's captain's blog, Captain Heerssen explains the vessel's historical name, adding that "the US Coast Guard has designated her as the Sailing School Vessel Niagara due to the nature of service in which she is routinely engaged." Retrieved 22 July 2011.
b. Although commonly referred to as a brig, she is technically a snow, as her spanker is rigged to a small try-mast, a.k.a. snow-mast, stepped abaft her main.

== Sources ==
- Baker, William Avery (1980). "The Flagship "Niagara"—Her History" (PDF). Archived from the original (PDF) on 26 July 2023.
- Dobbins, William W (1913). History of the Battle of Lake Erie (September 10, 1813) and Reminiscences of the Flagships "Lawrence" and "Niagara" (2nd ed.). Erie, PA: Ashby Printing.
- Knoll, Denys W (1979). Battle of Lake Erie: Building the Fleet in the Wilderness. Washington, DC: Naval Historical Foundation.
- Malcomson, Robert (October 2009). "Call her "U.S. Frigate" or "U.S. Ship"? Naming Warships from the War of 1812" (PDF). The Northern Mariner. XIX (4). Canadian Nautical Research Society: 405–412. doi:10.25071/2561-5467.394. S2CID 247309403.
- Magoc, Chris J (2001). Erie Maritime Museum and U.S. Brig Niagara. Pennsylvania Trail of History Guide. Mechanicsburg, PA: Stackpole. ISBN 0-8117-2756-4.
- New England Historic Genealogical Society (1994). New England Historical and Genealogical Register 1863. Vol. 17. Bowie, MD: Heritage Books. ISBN 1-55613-937-3.
- Pennsylvania Register of Historic Sites and Landmarks (July 1972). National Register of Historic Places Registration: Pennsylvania SP U.S.S. NIAGARA. National Archives and Records Administration. (Downloading may be slow.)
- Perry's Victory Centennial Commission, State of New York (1916). Perry's Victory Centenary. Albany, NY: J. B. Lyon.
- Severance, Frank H (1905). "The Dobbins Papers". Publications of the Buffalo Historical Society. 7. Buffalo, NY: Buffalo Historical Society: 257–379.
