= Modern Tool Company =

- U.S. National Register of Historic Places
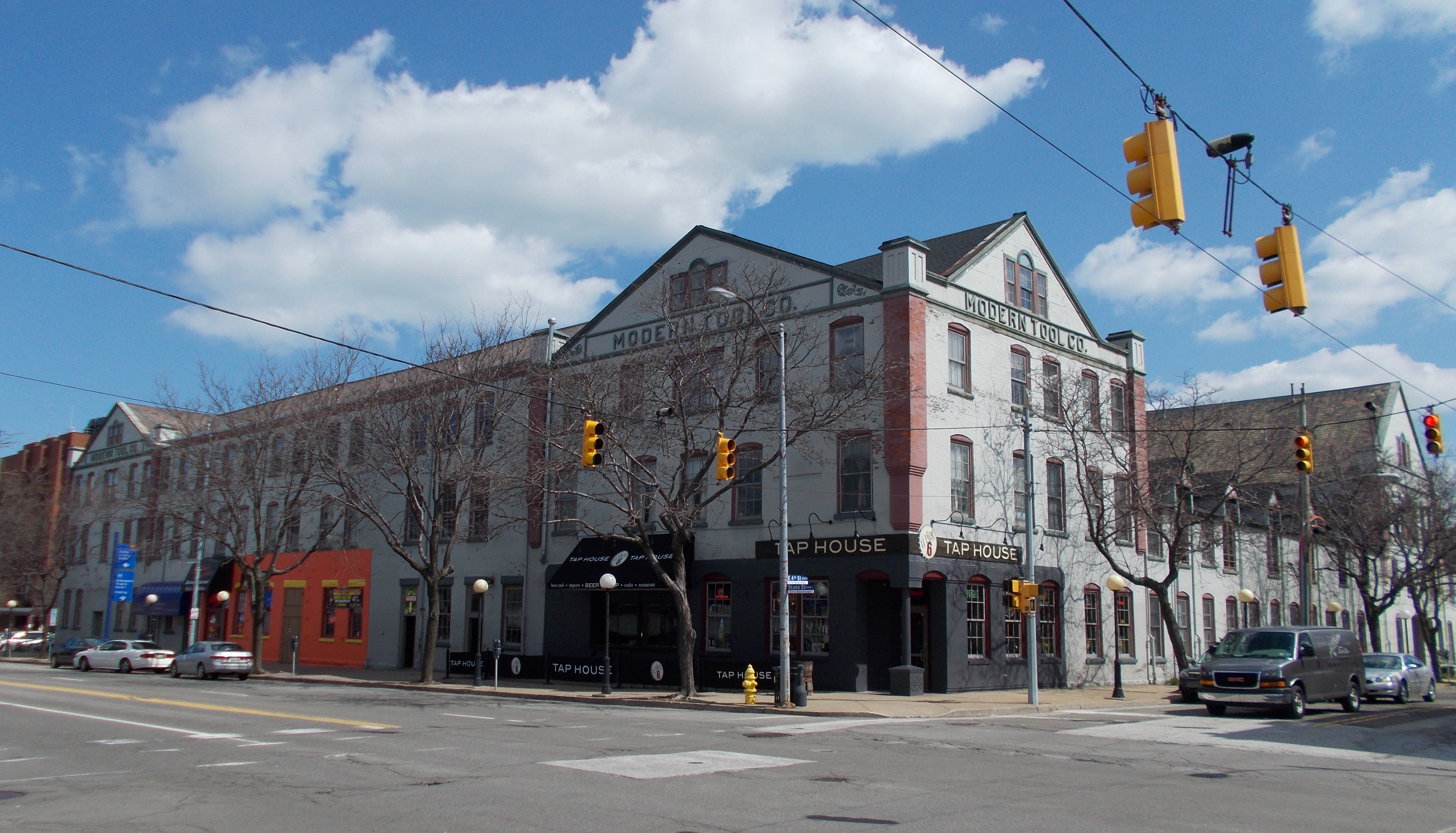
- Modern Tool Company, April 2013

- Location within Pennsylvania Location within the United States
- Location: NE jct. of State and Fourth Sts., Erie, Pennsylvania
- Coordinates: 42°07′53″N 80°05′12″W
- Area: 1.7 acres (0.69 ha)
- Built: 1895-1928
- Architect: H.R. Dunning (1895 portion)
- NRHP reference No.: 87000382
- Added to NRHP: March 6, 1987

Modern Tool Company, also known as the People's Market House, is a historic building located at Erie, Erie County, Pennsylvania. It is a large eclectic U-shaped, brick building built in stages between 1895 and 1928. The building measures 218 feet by 330 feet. The earliest section was built in 1895, as the People's Market House. It is 3 1/2 stories and has a large central pavilion with flanking two-story wings and a gable roof. The State Street side was built in five sections between 1916 and 1924. The northern block was added about 1928. It features Palladian windows and a corner turret. The original building housed a public market until 1902, after which it was leased to the Modern Tool Company, a machine tool manufacturer.

It was added to the National Register of Historic Places in 1987.

== Payne-Modern automobile ==
Calvin N. Payne founded Modern Tool Company in 1898. From 1904 he and his son Frank experimented with automobiles . Gilbert Loomis, who previously ran the Loomis Auto Car Company, joined Modern Tool in development of a car in 1906. However, he quickly left the company and joined the Speedwell Motor Car Company . In 1907 the production of automobiles began with the marque name of Payne-Modern.

The Payne-Modern was offered as a four-cylinder or a six-cylinder; both engines were air-cooled overhead valve units built in a "V" configuration. The transmission was patented with four speeds forward and reverse. Suspension was novel with semi-elliptic springs placed at a 15-degree angle with the outboard ends above the frame, the inside ends below. There were no outside hand levers on the Payne-Modern, the gearshift lever was located on the steering wheel. Final drive was by shaft. With runabout or touring bodies, the four-cylinder was priced at $2.200 (equivalent to $76,018 in 2025) while the six-cylinder was priced at $4,000, equivalent to $138,214 in 2025.

Likely the complexity of the automobiles hampered its production and the Payne-Modern was discontinued in 1908.

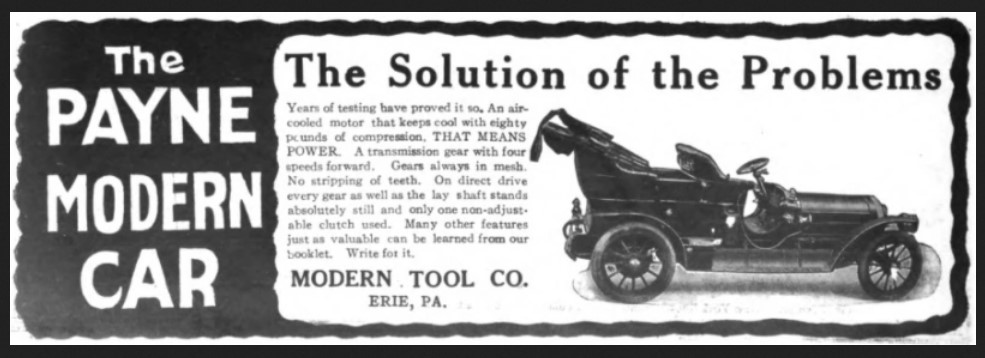
1907 Payne-Modern advertisement in Cycle and Automobile Journal

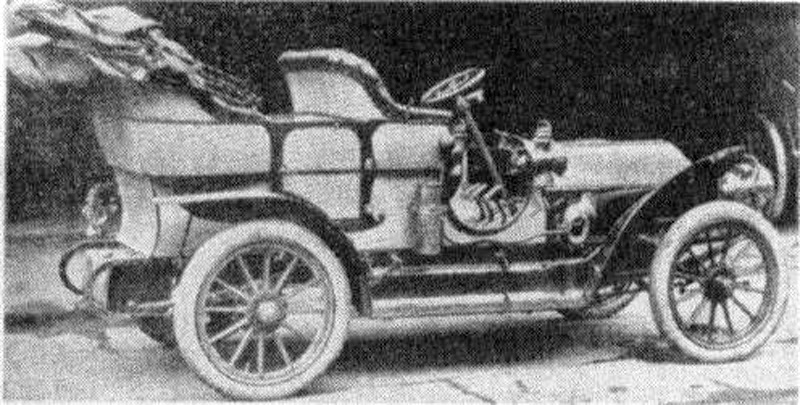
1908 Payne-Modern picture in Cycle and Automobile Journal

It is unknown if any cars are currently extant.
