= Pierre S. V. Hamot House =

Historic house in Pennsylvania, United States

- U.S. National Register of Historic Places
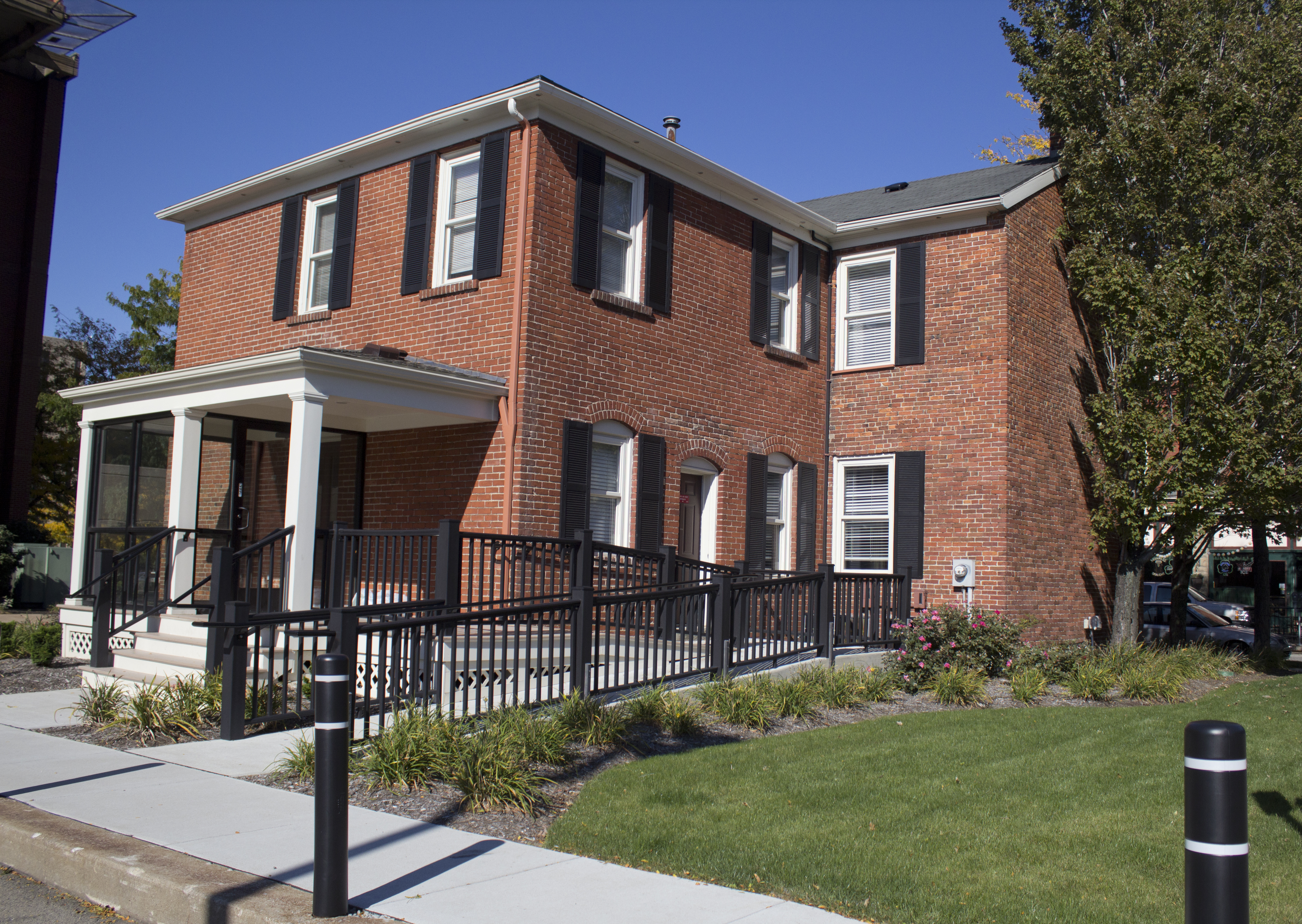
- Pierre S. V. Hamot House, September 2012

- Location within Pennsylvania Location within the United States
- Location: 302 French St., Erie, Pennsylvania
- Coordinates: 42°7′56″N 80°5′11″W
- Area: less than one acre
- Built: 1827-1831, c. 1870
- Architect: Growotz, Peter
- Architectural style: Federal
- NRHP reference No.: 91001707
- Added to NRHP: November 14, 1991

The Pierre S. V. Hamot House is an historic home that is located in Erie, Erie County, Pennsylvania, United States.

It was added to the National Register of Historic Places in 1991.

== History and architectural features ==
The original section of this historic structure was built between 1827 and 1831, with the rear ell built during the 1870s. It is a two-story brick dwelling that was designed in a vernacular Federal style. It sits on a Pennsylvania bluestone foundation and has a low-pitched roof. Rehabilitated by the Second Century Foundation, it is the earliest surviving brick residence in Erie.
