= Thayer-Thompson House =

Historic house in Pennsylvania, United States

- U.S. National Register of Historic Places
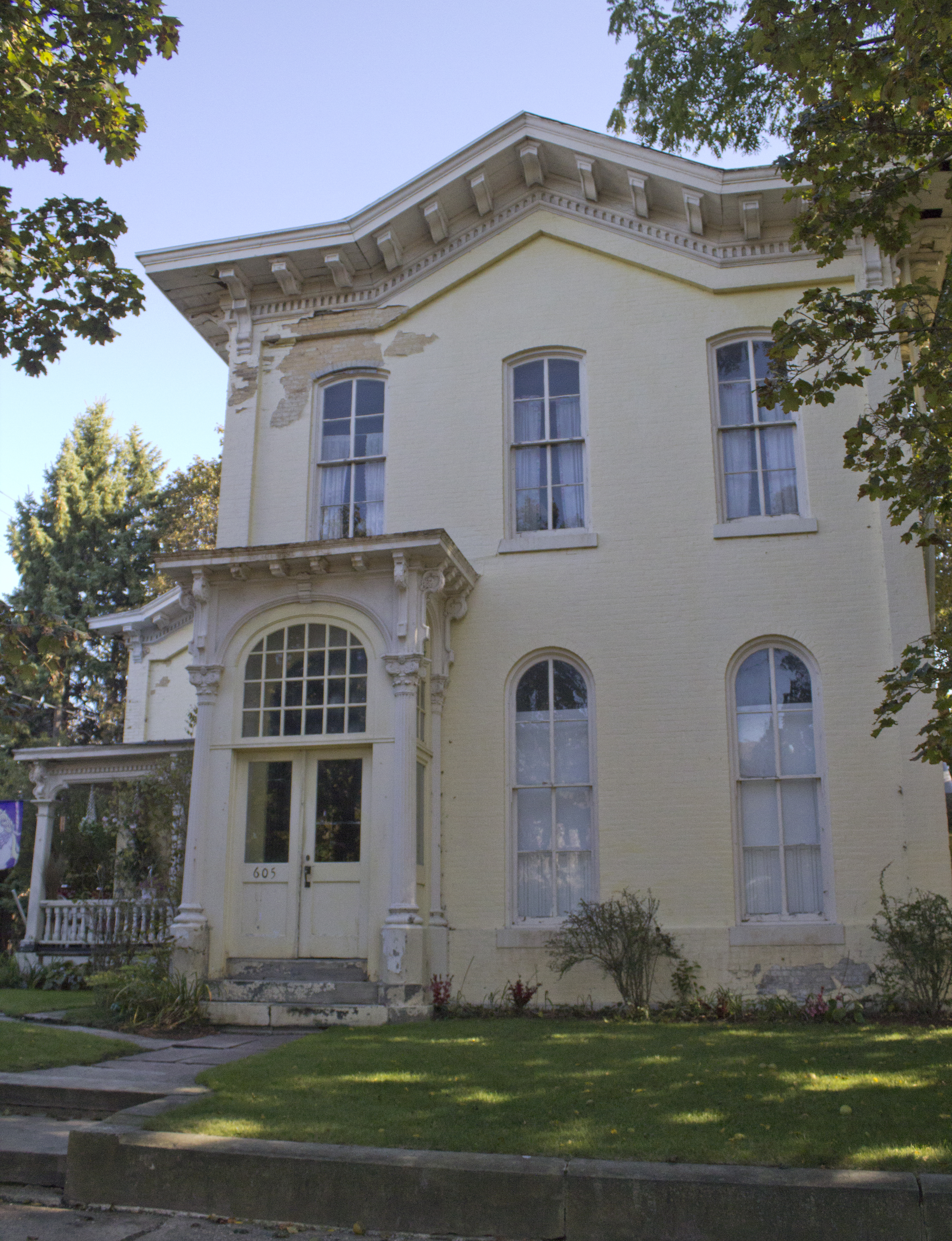
- Thayer-Thompson House, September 2012

- Location within Pennsylvania Location within the United States
- Interactive map showing the location of Thayer-Thompson House
- Location: 605 W. Eighth St., Erie, Pennsylvania
- Coordinates: 42°7′19″N 80°5′51″W
- Area: 0.2 acres (0.081 ha)
- Built: 1861
- Built by: Oscar Cornelius Thayer
- Architectural style: Italianate, Italian Villa, Tuscan Villa
- NRHP reference No.: 85003443
- Added to NRHP: October 31, 1985

The Thayer-Thompson House is an historic home that is located in Erie, Erie County, Pennsylvania, United States.

It was added to the National Register of Historic Places in 1985.

== History and architectural features ==
Completed in 1861, this historic structure is a two-story, five-bay, brick, irregularly-shaped dwelling. It is a combined Tuscan Villa/Italianate style building that features round-headed windows, prominent brackets, hipped roof with overhanging eaves, and square roof belvedere. It has an enclosed porch with Corinthian order pilasters.
