= Lovell Manufacturing Company =

- U.S. National Register of Historic Places
- U.S. Historic district
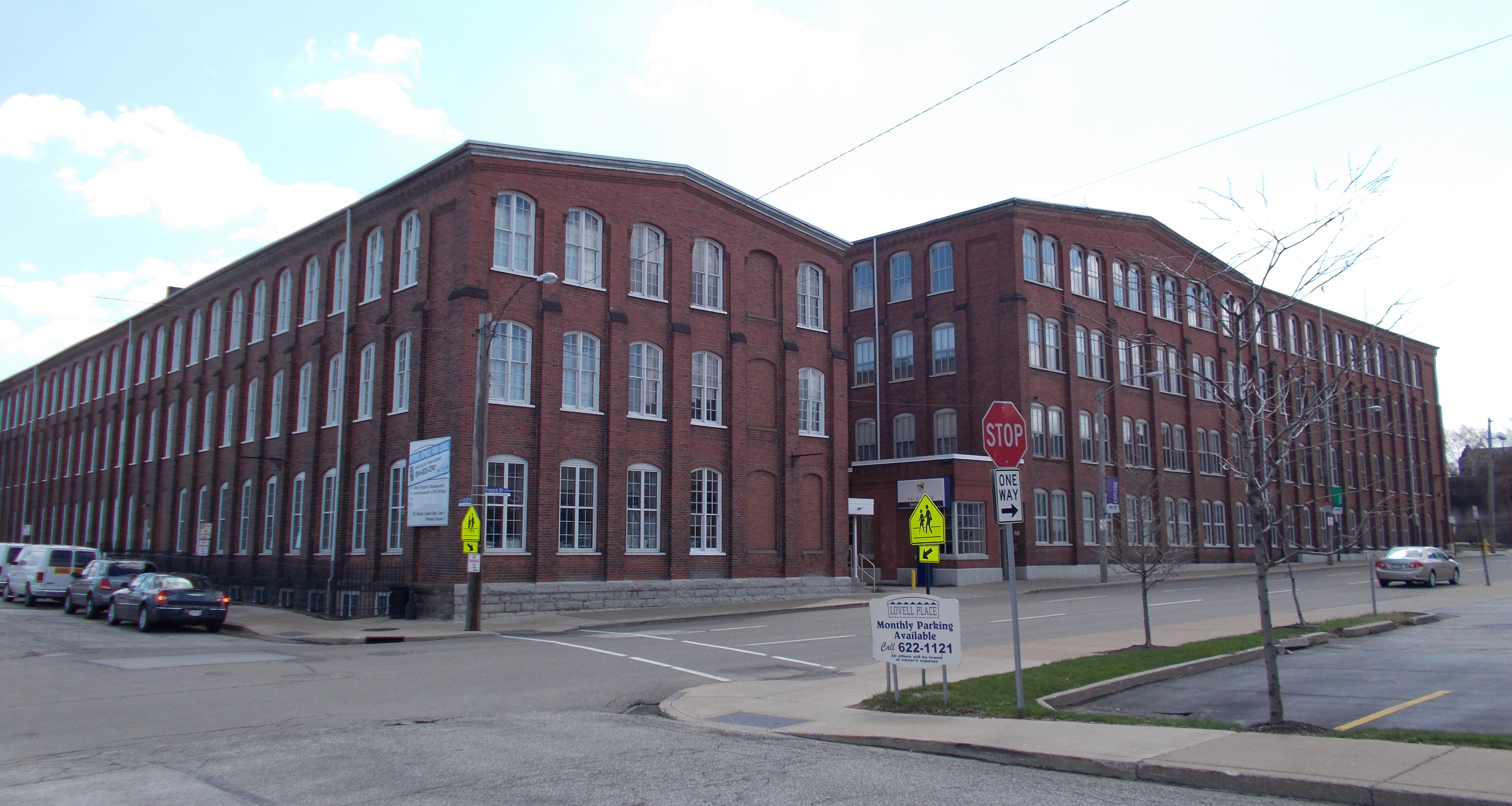
- Lovell Manufacturing Company, April 2013

- Location within Pennsylvania Location within the United States
- Location: 1301 French St., Erie, Pennsylvania
- Coordinates: 42°7′25″N 80°4′44″W
- Area: 4 acres (1.6 ha)
- Architectural style: Late 19th And Early 20th Century American Movements
- NRHP reference No.: 96001551
- Added to NRHP: January 16, 1997

Lovell Manufacturing Company, also known as Lovell Place, is an historic factory complex and national historic district which is located at Erie, Erie County, Pennsylvania.

It was added to the National Register of Historic Places in 1997.

== History and architectural features ==
It includes nine contributing buildings. The buildings and their additions were built between 1883 and 1946. They are characterized as simple brick industrial buildings with shallow gable and parapet roofs, and housed a manufacturer of bed springs, mouse and rat traps, wringers, and dryers. Included in the complex were a foundry and machine shop and a sports gear outlet. A cricket ball that was "Indian made" but branded "Lovell PA EERIE" on the reverse is preserved in a private collection in Australia. It likely would have been sold in a retail outlet in the complex.

On May 9th 1957, a boiler exploded at the factory complex killing one worked named John W. Bojack and injuring 7 other workers.
