= West Park Place =

- U.S. National Register of Historic Places
- U.S. Historic district
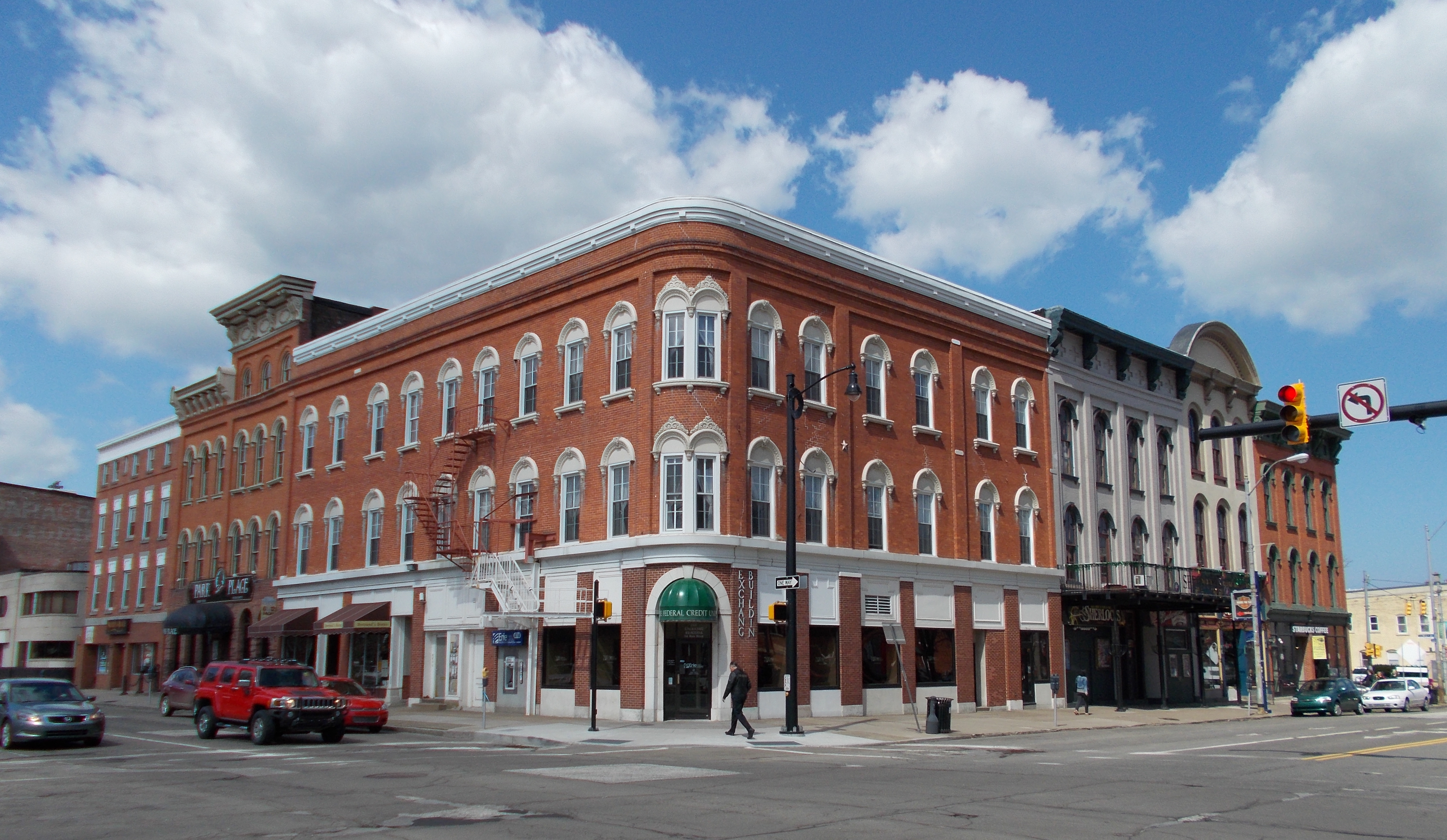
- West Park Place, April 2013

- Location within Pennsylvania Location within the United States
- Location: Bounded by N. Park Row, Peach, 5th, and State Sts., Erie, Pennsylvania
- Coordinates: 42°07′48″N 80°05′11″W
- Area: 2.3 acres (0.93 ha)
- Built: 1857-1865
- Built by: Hill, John; Et al.
- Architectural style: Italianate
- NRHP reference No.: 80003489
- Added to NRHP: September 4, 1980

West Park Place is a national historic district that is located in Erie, Erie County, Pennsylvania.

It was added to the National Register of Historic Places in 1980.

== History and architectural features ==
This district encompasses twelve contributing commercial buildings that were built between 1857 and 1865. They are characterized as three-story brick buildings that were erected over full basements. Designed in the Italianate style, they reflect Erie's mid-nineteenth-century central business district. The district includes the Bindernecht Block, the Purcell Hardware Store and the "Marble Front" building. A number of the buildings were designed and built by John Hill, who also built the John Hill House that is located in the West Sixth Street Historic District.

It was added to the National Register of Historic Places in 1980.
