= Erie Maritime Museum =

Coordinates: 42.1366°N 80.0867°W

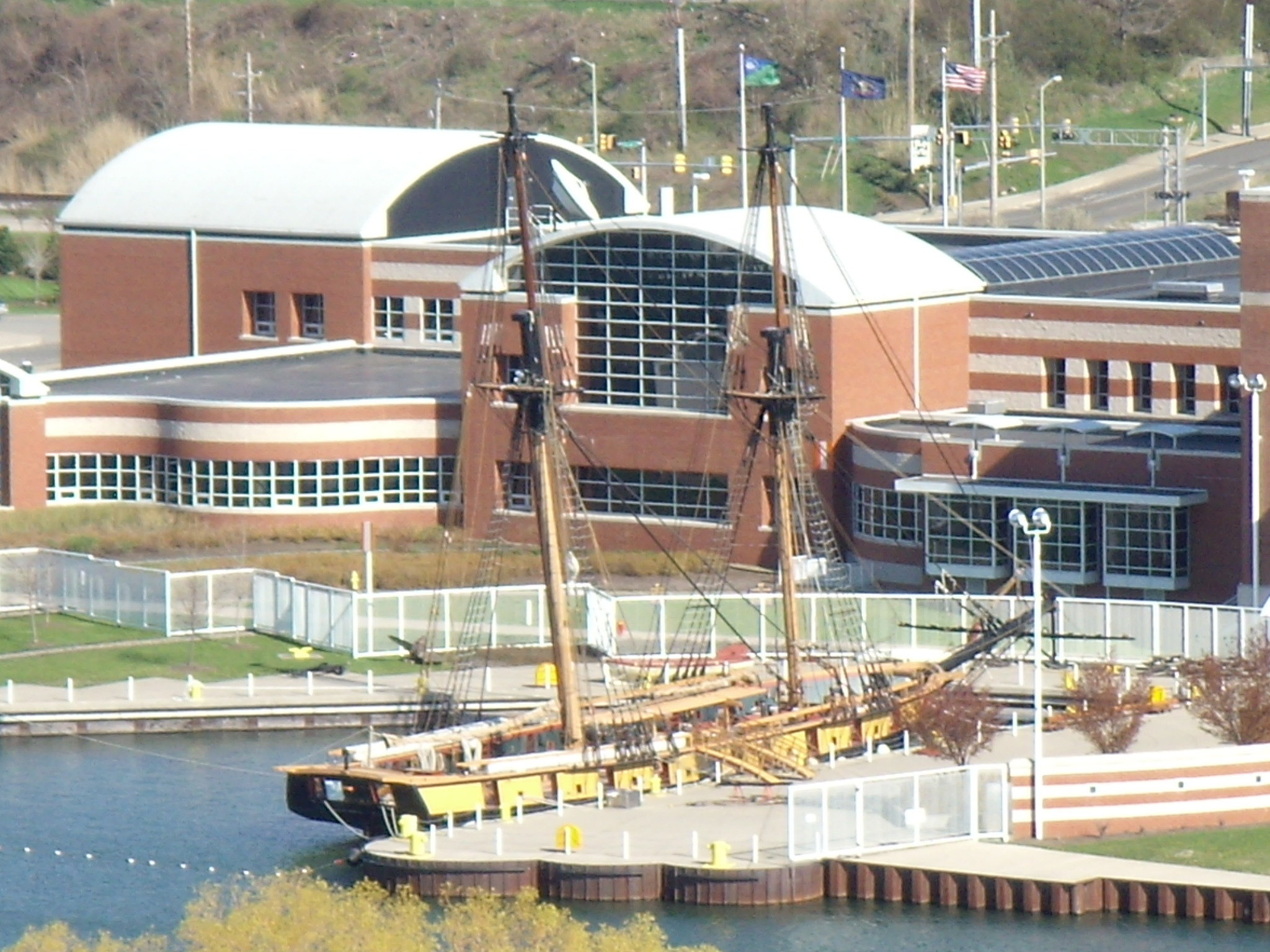
- US Brig Niagara docked behind the Erie Maritime Museum.
- Established: May 21, 1998
- Location: 150 East Front Street; Erie, Pennsylvania
- Type: Maritime museum
- Public transit access: Erie Metropolitan Transit Authority
- Website: https://www.eriemaritimemuseum.org/

Erie Maritime Museum is a maritime museum located on Presque Isle Bay which rests on the waterfront in downtown Erie, Pennsylvania. It is managed by the Pennsylvania Historical and Museum Commission (PHMC). When it opened its doors on May 21, 1998, it became the first new Pennsylvania Historical and Museum Commission-affiliated museum in twenty years. Alongside its extensive indoor exhibits, it serves as the homeport for the US Brig Niagara, a modern recreation of the 1813-US Brig Niagara which served as Commodore Oliver Hazard Perry's relief flagship during the Battle of Lake Erie. While the museum focuses on the War of 1812 in the "frontier", it is designed to celebrate Erie's rich maritime heritage.

== Administration ==
The Erie Maritime Museum is administered by the Pennsylvania Historical and Museum Commission and is partnered with the Flagship Niagara League, a 501(c) non-profit, educational associate which is chartered by the PHMC to facilitate the brig Niagara.

== History of the building ==
The Erie Maritime Museum is housed inside the former Penelec Front Street Station. From 1917 until the 1980s, the building was used to generate Erie, Pennsylvania's electricity and steam heat. Inside were five coal-fired steam generators. Remnants of Penelec's presence on the property can be found to this day. Visitors to the museum can view the original smoke stack which rests to the west of the parking lot. Additionally, once inside, guests are able to view a General Electric steam-powered generator and the station's original crane, which still works today. When Penelec decided to shut down their Front Street operation, the goal was to tear down the structure. Plans changed after local officials convinced Penelec to save the building for future use.

When the current version of the US Brig Niagara was completed in 1990, it needed a new home. In 1993, Niagara was berthed at the end of Holland Street, just to the east of its current location. Finally, in 1997 the Erie Maritime Museum began constructing its exhibits and displays. In May 1998, Niagara was moved to her current home and the Erie Maritime Museum opened its doors.

== Permanent exhibits ==
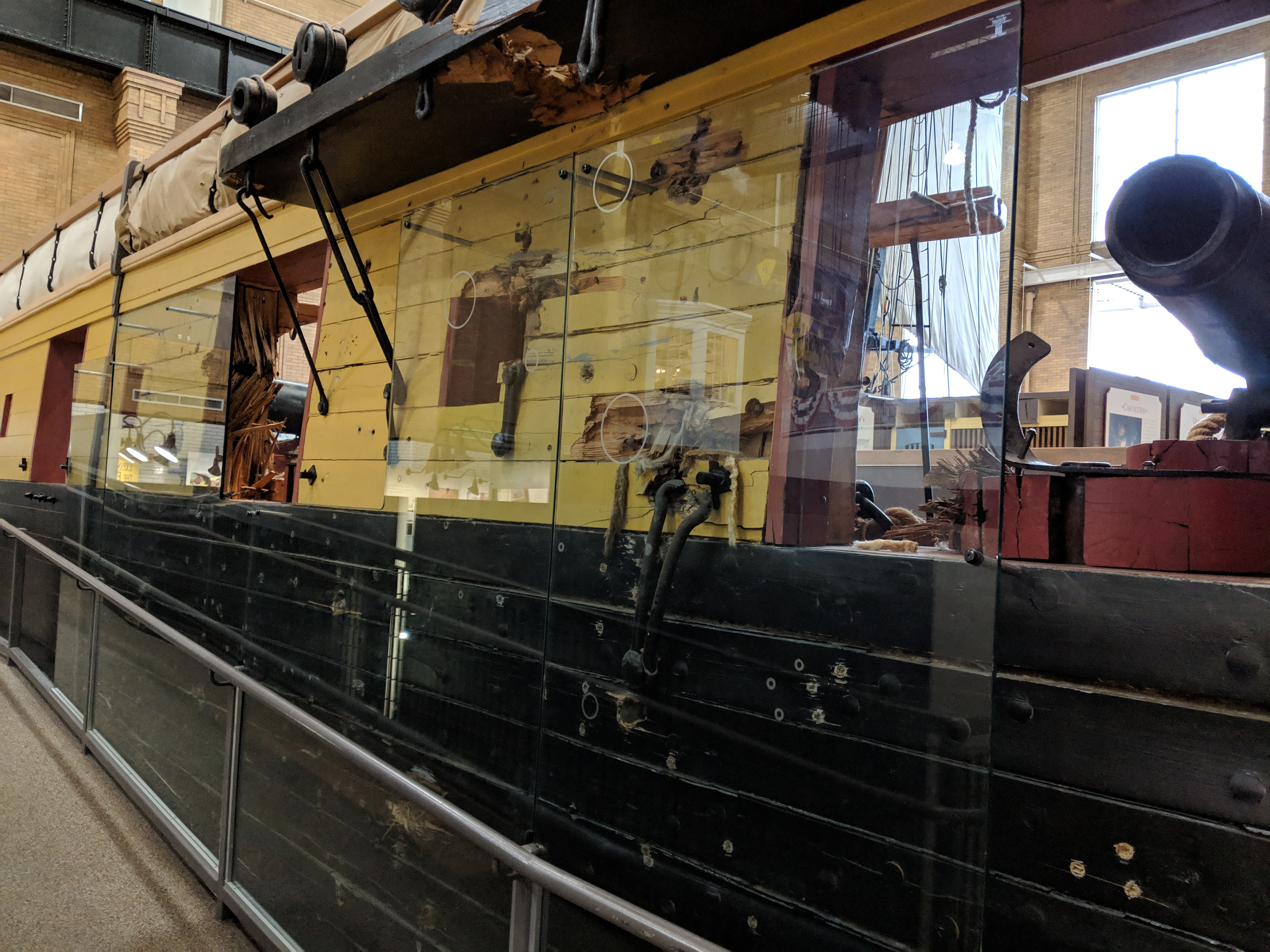
The Live Fire section of the brig Lawrence illustrates damage from various types of 19th-century naval artillery

The museum offers a wide range of multimedia and interactive exhibits coupled with interpretive programs that illustrate the region's maritime heritage. When in homeport, the Niagara herself is the major "exhibit". Berthed within yards of the museum, Niagara is visible from the building's bay side picture window. The present-day Niagara is a sail training vessel, meaning she is not always present at the museum for deck tours. Oftentimes during the warmer months, she can be found in ports across the Great Lakes.

=== Indoor exhibits ===
Former General Electric steam-powered electricity generating station from the Pennsylvania Electric Company's Front Street station.

Julian Oliver Davidon's epic painting of the Battle of Lake Erie is on display on the main floor. The 54-by-102-inch (1,400 mm × 2,600 mm) masterpiece focuses on the climax of the Battle of Lake Erie. Painted from 1885–87, the artwork captures the Brig Niagara, "Crossing the T" and opening fire on both HMS Detroit and Queen Charlotte thereby leading to the British surrender at Put-In-Bay, the first time in world history that an entire British squadron surrendered to their enemy.

The Battle of Lake Erie exhibit covers a thematic background, featuring information about the issues behind the War of 1812, size differences between the American, British, and Canadian forces, Uniforms, and why Erie, Pennsylvania was chosen for building the American Great Lakes fleet.

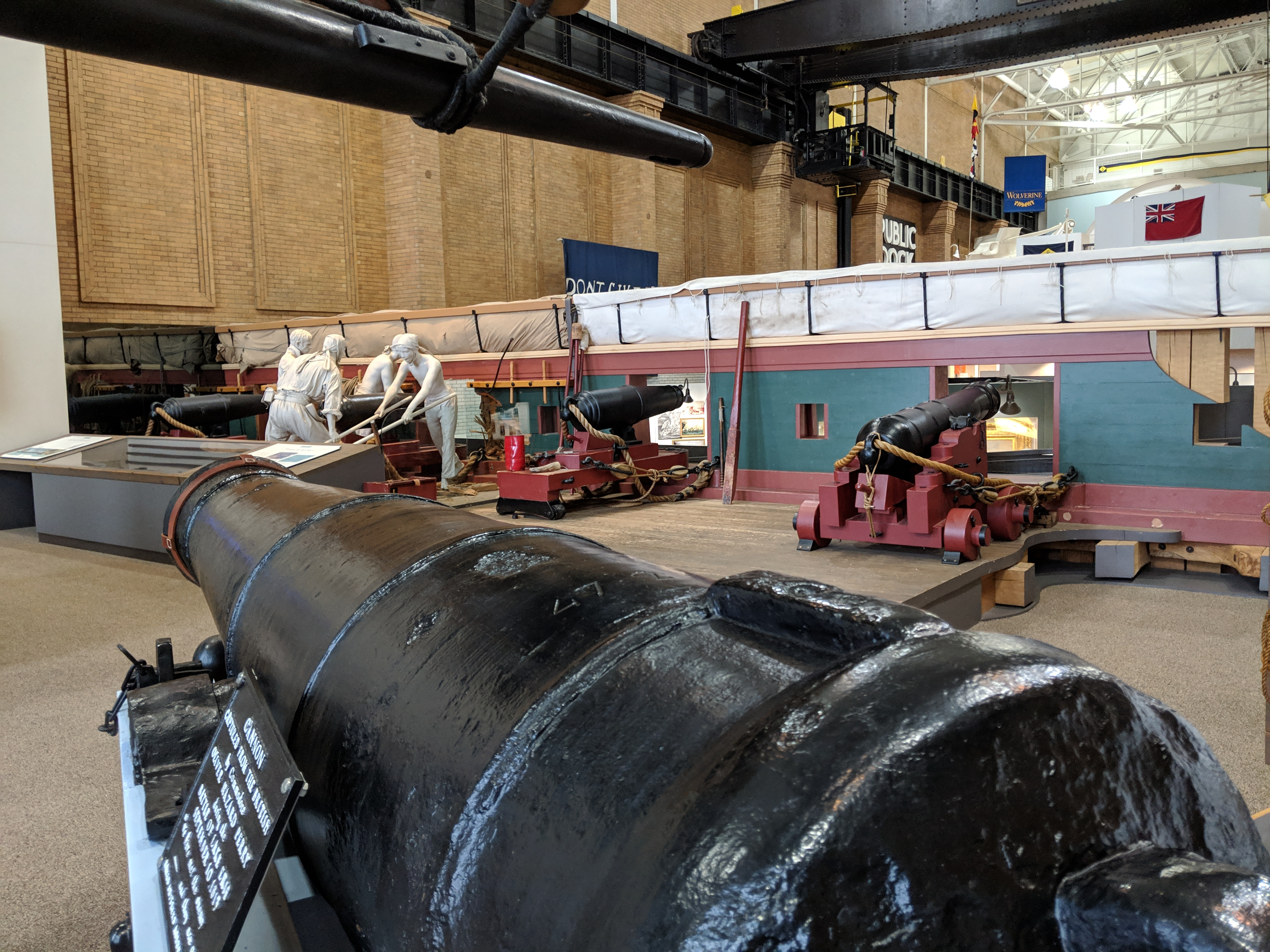
Located on the main floor, this exhibit depicts the gun deck of the brig Lawrence.

The centerpiece exhibit on the first floor of the museum features a reconstruction of the midships section of USS Lawrence. The replicated Lawrence, Commodore Oliver Hazard Perry's first flagship during the Battle of Lake Erie, comes complete with mast, spars and rigging to foster hands-on learning in the ways of sail handling. Another display is the adjoining section of the Lawrence' replica that has been blasted with live ammunition from the current Niagara's own carronades at the National Guard training facility in Fort Indiantown Gap, near Harrisburg. This "live fire" exhibit of Lawrence recreates the carnage inflicted upon both ships and men during the Battle of Lake Erie and throughout the Age of Fighting Sail.

Fighting Sail presents a life size upper-portion of a working mast taken directly from the current iteration of Niagara shortly after the Museum's opening in May 1998. This exhibit focuses on the construction of wooden sailing vessels, shipboard life, 19th Century Navy medicine, a gun deck recreation from Lawrence, shipbuilding tools, knots, and more.

On the second floor of the museum is an exhibit dedicated to the crew and officers of USS Wolverine (formerly USS Michigan), the United States Navy's first iron-hulled warship and 19th-20th century Navy. The ship's original prow serves as the exhibit's centerpiece, and includes models of the vessel, armament, uniforms, and personal articles.

Other exhibits inside the museum include: Model Making, Lighthouses and Lifesaving in Erie, Lake Erie Fishing Industry, Joe Divell's Lake Diving, Maritime Archaeology, US Brig Niagara Reconstruction, etc.

== Location ==
The museum, which adjoins the Raymond Blasco Erie County Library, is located at 150 East Front St.

== See also ==
- List of maritime museums in the United States
- List of museum ships
