= Villa Maria Academy (1892) =

- U.S. National Register of Historic Places
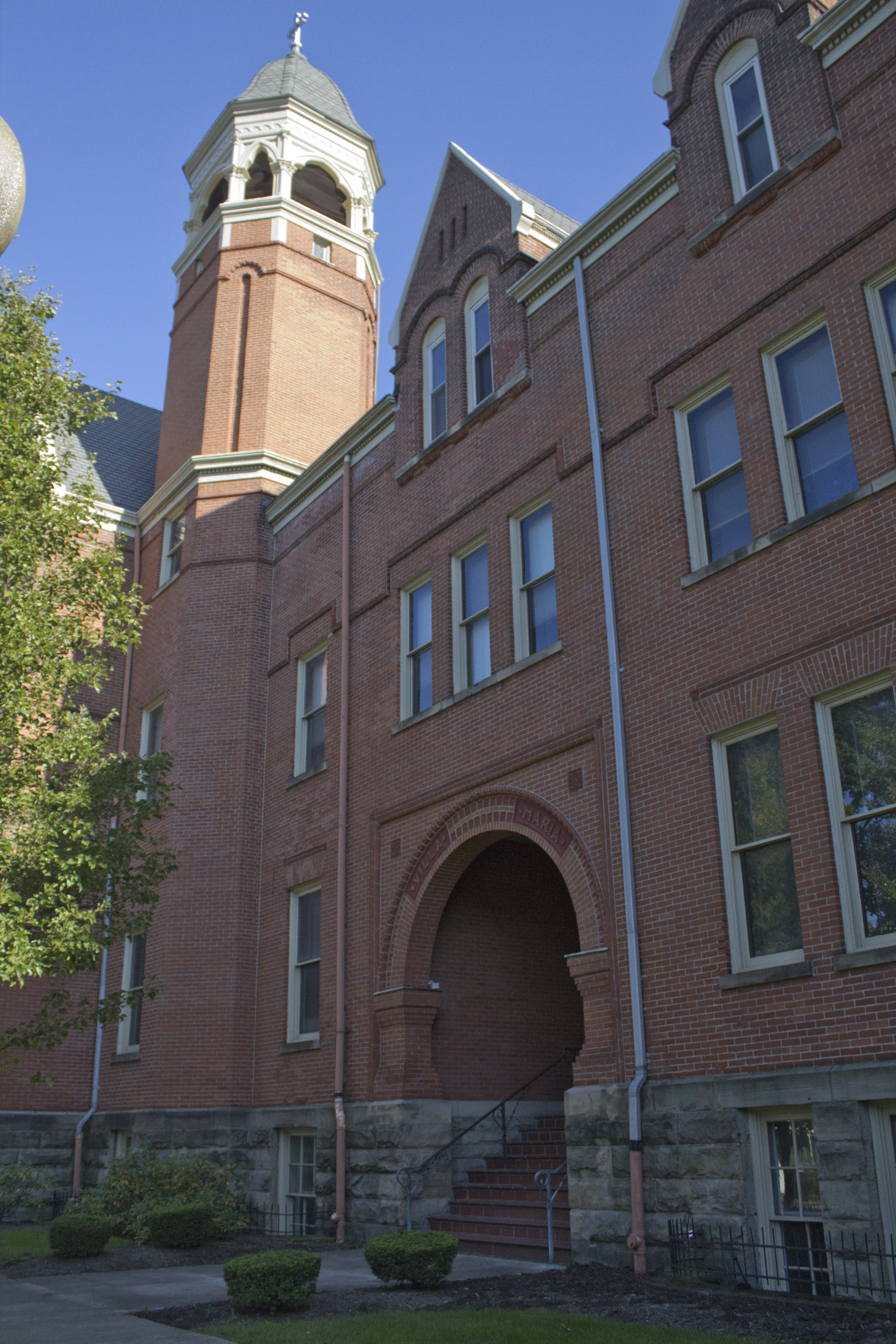
- Villa Maria Academy, September 2012

- Location within Pennsylvania Location within the United States
- Location: 819 W. 8th St., Erie, Pennsylvania
- Coordinates: 42°7′13″N 80°6′4″W
- Area: 2.5 acres (1.0 ha)
- Built: 1892, 1904, 1927
- Architect: David K. Dean & Sons, F.F. Hecker, Fuller and Stickle
- Architectural style: Late Gothic Revival
- NRHP reference No.: 96001193
- Added to NRHP: November 8, 1996

The Villa Maria Academy is a complex of two connected historic school buildings located in Erie, Erie County, Pennsylvania.

It was added to the National Register of Historic Places in 1996.

== History and architectural features ==
This academy was built in 1892, with additions and alterations in 1904 and 1927. The original building, known as the motherhouse, is a 2 1/2-story, red brick building with terra cotta trim. Designed in the High Victorian Gothic style, it features a cross gable roof with dormers and two conical roof turrets.

The 3 1/2-story addition was completed in 1904. It was designed in the Gothic style and features parapet walls, a second story projecting bay, terra cotta decoration, and a hipped roof with dormers.

Gannon Hall was built in 1927 and is connected to the original academy building by a two-story bridge. It is a 3 1/2-story, gable roofed building that was designed in the Late Gothic Revival style. The brick building features stepped gable dormers and the College Chapel section with stained glass windows, conical roof tower, and pointed buttresses. The College Chapel, also known as Villa Chapel, was added to Preservation Pennsylvania At Risk List in 2011.

It was added to the National Register of Historic Places in 1996.
