= Chandlery Corner =

Historic house in Pennsylvania, United States

- U.S. National Register of Historic Places
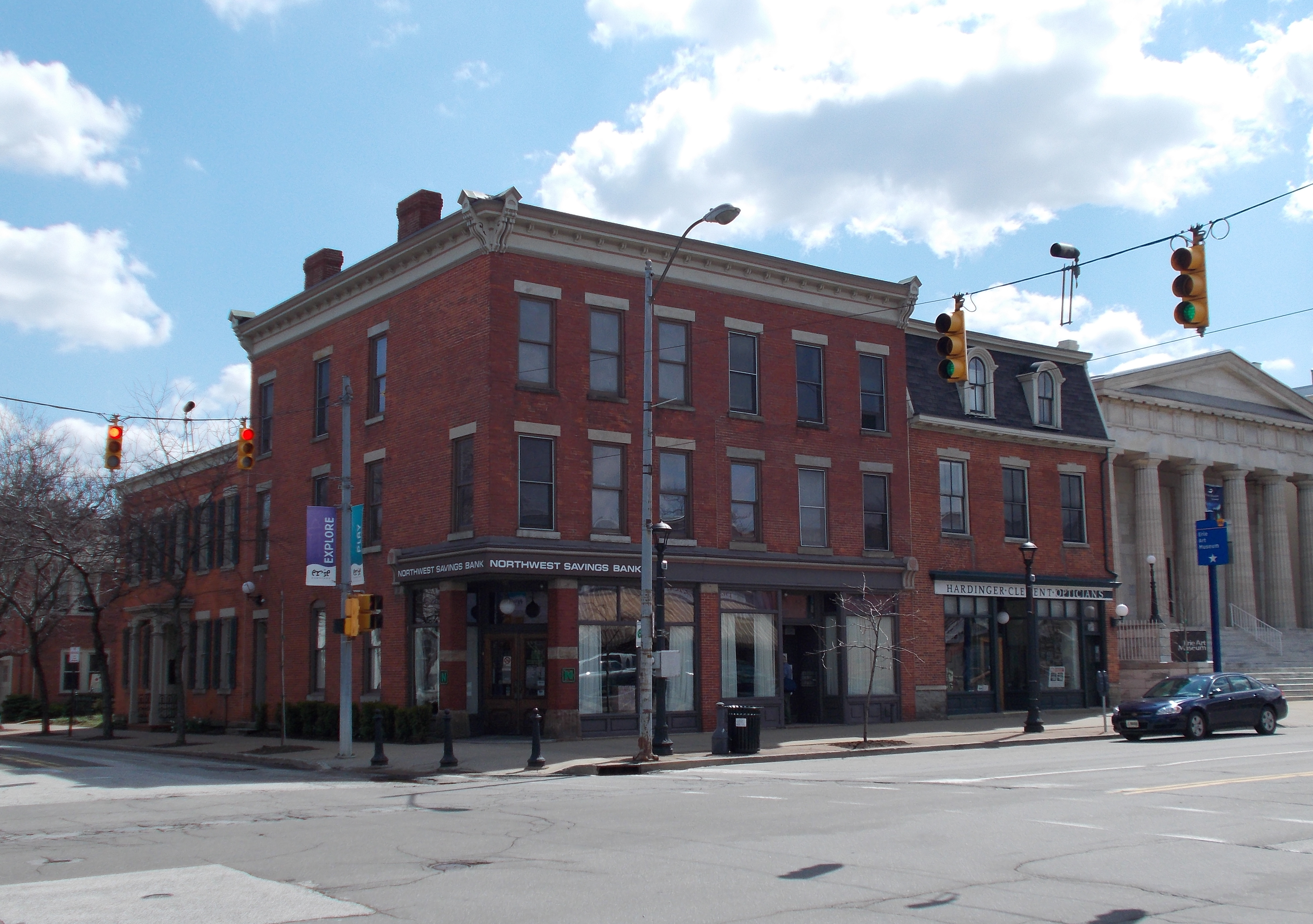
- Chandlery Corner, April 2013

- Location within Pennsylvania Location within the United States
- Location: 1 and 3 E. Fourth St., and 401-403, and 405 State St., Erie, Pennsylvania
- Coordinates: 42°7′53″N 80°5′12″W
- Area: 0.2 acres (0.081 ha)
- Built: 1832, 1846, 1851
- Architectural style: Greek Revival, Federal
- NRHP reference No.: 87000030
- Added to NRHP: February 5, 1987

Chandlery Corner consists of three historic buildings located at Erie, Erie County, Pennsylvania. They are the Peter Rockwell House, Frederick Schneider House, and Schneider/Kessler Chandlery.

It was added to the National Register of Historic Places in 1987.

== History ==
The Peter Rockwell House was built in 1832, as a Federal-style brick townhouse. It was modified for commercial use about 1865 to be a 2 1/2-story commercial building with a mansard roof. The Frederick Schneider House was built in 1846, is a two-story five-bay brick dwelling in the Greek Revival style. The Schneider/Kessler Chandlery was built in 1851, is a three-story six-bay brick commercial building. The buildings are reflective of the 19th-century business district of Erie. It was named Chandlery Corner because it is the site of the plant and store of Erie's first soap and candle maker.
