= Old Customshouse (Erie, Pennsylvania) =

- U.S. National Register of Historic Places
- Pennsylvania state historical marker
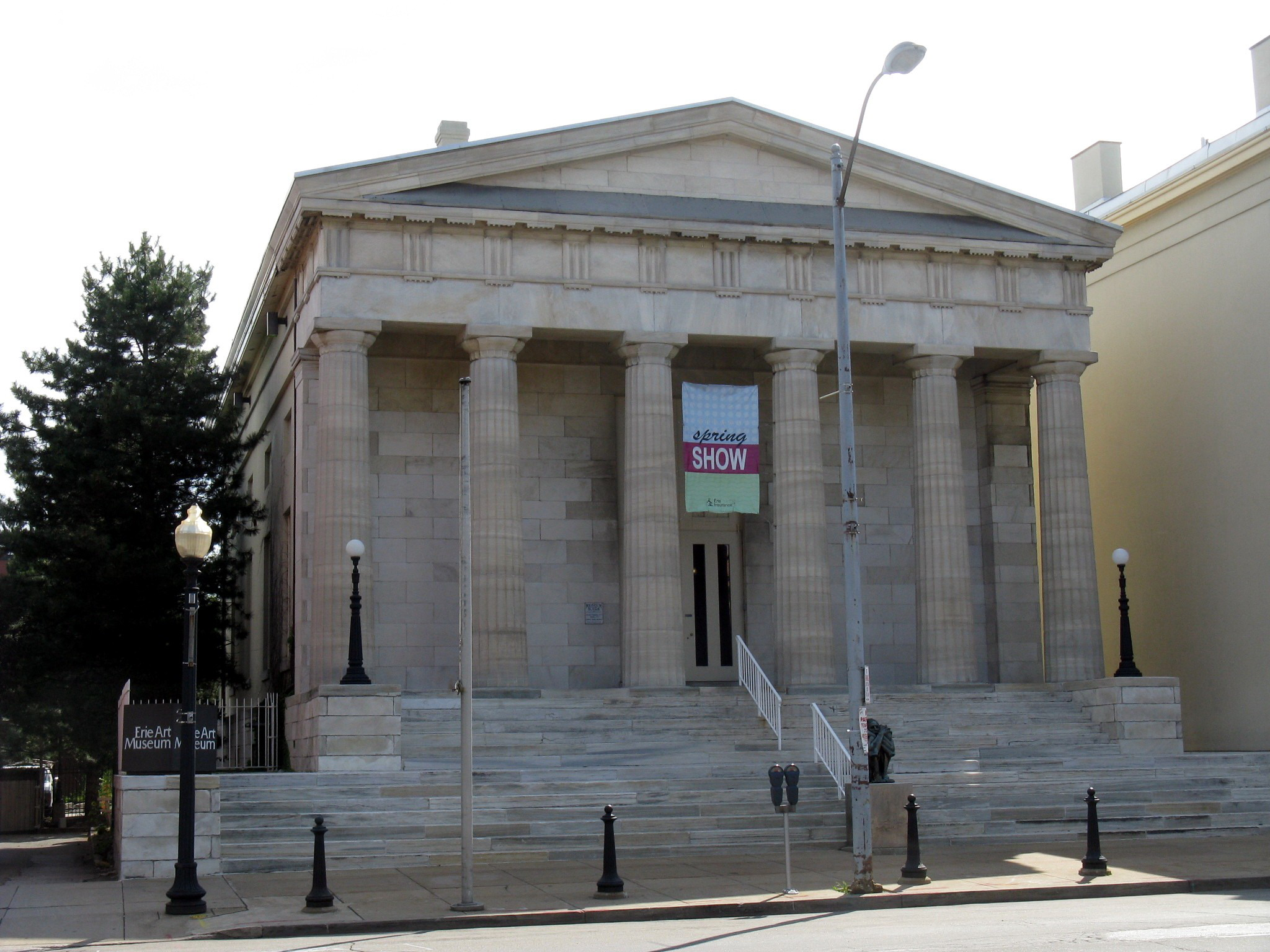
- Old Customshouse, July 2010

- Location within Pennsylvania Location within the United States
- Location: 409 State St., Erie, Pennsylvania
- Coordinates: 42°7′48″N 80°5′10″W
- Area: less than one acre
- Built: 1838–1839
- Architect: Kelly, William
- Architectural style: Greek Revival
- NRHP reference No.: 72001122

Significant dates
- Added to NRHP: January 13, 1972
- Designated PHMC: November 1, 1946

The Old Customshouse is an historic custom house building in Erie, Erie County, Pennsylvania, United States.

It was added to the National Register of Historic Places in 1972.

== History and architectural features ==
Built between 1838 and 1839, this historic structure is a two-story, rectangular, brick and Vermont marble building. The front facade features a pedimented portico with six two-story, Doric order columns. Designed in the Greek Revival style, this building housed Erie's post office until 1867, served as the Customs House for the port of Erie from 1849 to 1888, and later housed a Grand Army of the Republic post and the Erie County Historical Society. It is now part of a five-building complex of the Erie Art Museum.
