= USS Ariel (1813) =

American clipper schnooner

History

United States
- Name: Ariel
- Builder: Adam and Noah Brown, Presque Isle Bay, Pennsylvania
- Launched: April 1813

General characteristics
- Type: Schooner
- Tonnage: 70-long-ton (71 t) (net); 112-long-ton (114 t) (gross)
- Length: 70 feet (21 m)
- Sail plan: Gaff rig
- Complement: 36
- Armament: 4 × 12-pounder long guns

The second USS Ariel was a clipper schooner built on Lake Erie at Presque Isle Bay, Pennsylvania, in 1813, by Adam and Noah Brown. She was launched in April 1813 and commissioned sometime during the ensuing summer, Lt. John H. Packett in command.

== Design ==
She was 70 feet (21 m) 70-long-ton (71 t) and armed with four 12-pounder long guns mounted on pivots. One cannon was forward of the foremast, two were between the masts, and one was abaft the main. Ariel was very sharp and had a reputation for speed.

== Service history ==
At the outset of her service, Ariel was blockaded in the harbor at Presque Isle by the British squadron under Captain Robert Heriot Barclay, Royal Navy, until 2 August. However, when the English warships sailed away that day, Lieutenant Oliver Hazard Perry at once moved to get his squadron out into the lake. That action necessitated removing the guns from the two largest vessels of the squadron, the 20-gun brigs Lawrence and Niagara, and literally carrying them over the shallow bar at the entrance to the harbor. Lawrence passed over the bar early on the morning of 5 August. At about 8:00 that morning, the British squadron reappeared and traded long-range gunfire with Ariel and other small units of the American flotilla. Apparently Barclay did not realize that the two heaviest units in the American force were still without guns and undermanned for, after trading a few rounds with Ariel and her colleagues, he drew off and gave the Americans time to rearm and bring their complements up to strength. Soon thereafter, Niagara also crossed the bar; and the Americans began preparations for battle.

Perry and his squadron left Presque Isle on the 18th to search for the British. However, by then Barclay had put into Amherstburg; and he remained there until the beginning of the second week in September. Meanwhile, after cruising around the lake fruitlessly for a time, Perry took all his ships, except Ohio which he sent down the lake, into Put-in-Bay.

=== Battle of Lake Erie ===
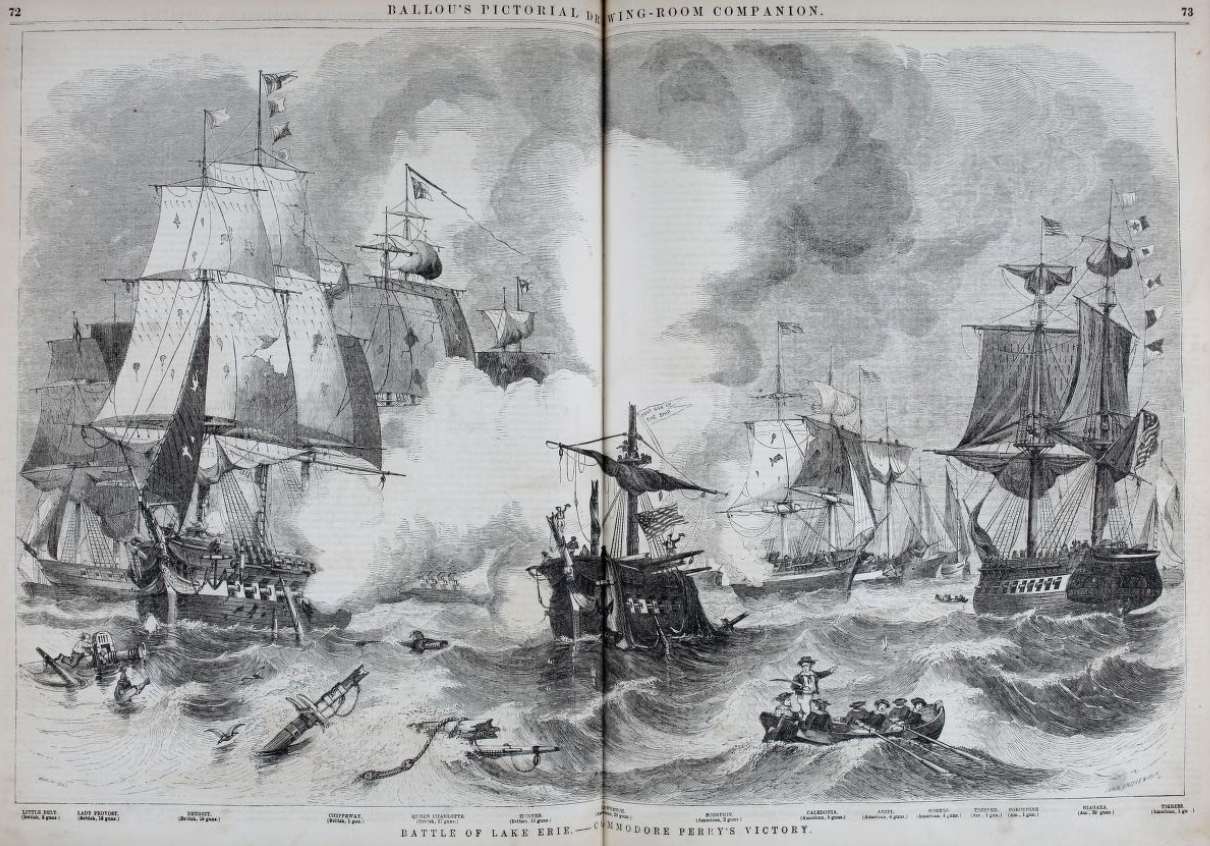
Battle of Lake Erie, Ballou's Pictorial 1856

On 9 September, the British squadron, dangerously short of provisions, left Amherstburg in search of a decision with the superior American unit. When Lawrence's lookout sighted Barclay's squadron on the horizon at daybreak on 10 September, Perry immediately ordered his ships to weigh anchor. As the American force steered generally northwest to meet the enemy, Ariel and Scorpion led the column, with Lawrence immediately astern and the rest of the Americans at some distance back. The action opened at about 1145 with some extreme range shots from a long 24-pounder on board HMS Detroit, second ship in the British column. Scorpion responded with her long 32-pounder, but Ariel, armed only with long 12-pounders, apparently held her fire for a time. Within 10 minutes, the action became general, at least between the British and three or four of the leading American ships. The rearmost American's were still quite out of range. Ariel, Scorpion, and Caledonia appear to have suffered little due to the fact that the British concentrated upon Lawrence. The smaller warships, however, stood gallantly by their stricken flagship inflicting on the enemy what damage they could. During the first phase of the Battle of Lake Erie, Ariel lost one of her four 12-pounders when it burst due to an overload.

Two hours and 30 minutes into the action, Lawrence was a battered wreck with her last gun silenced. Ariel, Scorpion, and Caledonia remained in action as the fresh Niagara finally hauled up to join in the close action. At that point, Perry shifted his flag to Niagara and charged to break the British line of battle. Lawrence, with but 14 effective seamen, struck her colors soon after Perry crossed over to Niagara. The British were never able to take possession of her, though, because Niagara succeeded admirably in breaking the British line and raking three of their ships to port and the other three to starboard. Meanwhile, Ariel and Scorpion provided what amounted to a crossfire on the three ships to Niagara's portside. Within 15 minutes of his line being broken, Barclay, his major units in shambles, lowered his flag in surrender. Two of the smaller British ships tried to flee, but Scorpion and Trippe shepherded them back later that night. Throughout the battle, Ariel lost only one man killed and three wounded. On the night of 11 September, both squadrons entered Put-in-Bay.

=== Battle of the Thames ===
The defeat of the British squadron on Lake Erie opened the way for the recapture of the Northwest Territory (primarily what is now the state of Michigan) and for an invasion of Canada. After repairing the ships of the squadron and their prizes, Perry began embarking the troops of General William Henry Harrison's invasion force on 24 September. That operation complete, the squadron and its embarked troops set out for the mouth of the Thames River on the 27th. They reached their destination at about 4 o'clock that afternoon, and the troops moved ashore unopposed. Three ships of the squadron moved upriver as the American troops advanced on the retreating British. Although some sources indicate that Ariel was one of those ships, others which are probably more reliable indicate that the troops were accompanied by Scorpion, Tigress, and Porcupine. However, these records state that even those three ships were unable to ascend the river far enough to participate in the American victory in the Battle of the Thames fought on 5 October 1813. Ariel, therefore, probably rode at anchor at the mouth of the river throughout the operation. The brief campaign ended two days after the battle when the American troops returned to Detroit to consolidate once more their position in Michigan while the American flotilla reigned supreme on Lake Erie.

== End of career ==
Ariel's subsequent career remains a mystery. One source suggests that she was burned during the British raid on Black Rock (now Buffalo), N.Y., on 29 and 30 December. That end, however, seems unlikely for she was carried on a list of ships dated 18 March 1814; and Theodore Roosevelt, in his still-respected study, "Naval War of 1812", indicates that she joined three other small warships on a brief raid of British posts along the northern shores of Lake Huron. Unfortunately, none of the sources offer any real substantiation for their assertions. All that can be clearly stated is that her name was not included with those of her sister schooners on a list of United States naval vessels dated 2 January 1816. It has been reported that she was wrecked in 1814.

== Notes ==
Citations

== Bibliography ==
Books

- Chapelle, Howard I. (20 August 1998). The History of the American Sailing Navy. ISBN 1568522223.

Online resources

- DANFS (18 June 2015). "Ariel II (Schooner)". Naval History and Heritage Command. Archived from the original on December 9, 2024.
- "ARIEL, USS; 1813; Schooner; AMERICAN". Great Lakes Maritime Database.
