= USS Tigress (1813) =

History

United States
- Name: USS Tigress
- Builder: Adam and Noah Brown, Erie, Pennsylvania
- Launched: 1813
- Commissioned: 1813
- Fate: Captured by the British, 3 September 1814

United Kingdom
- Name: HMS Surprise
- Fate: Sunk at her moorings

General characteristics
- Type: Schooner
- Tonnage: 52 long tons (53 t)
- Length: 50 ft (15 m) p/p
- Beam: 17 ft (5.2 m)
- Depth of hold: 5 ft (1.5 m)
- Complement: 27
- Armament: 1 × 32-pounder gun

USS Tigress was a schooner of the United States Navy which took part in the Battle of Lake Erie in 1813. In September 1814, the schooner was captured by the British and subsequently served in the Royal Navy as HMS Surprise.

== Service history ==
=== Battle of Lake Erie ===
Built at Erie, Pennsylvania, by Adam and Noah Brown, as the schooner Amelia. She was launched in the spring of 1813, probably in April. The ship was then acquired by the Navy for service with Master Commandant Oliver Hazard Perry's forces on Lake Erie, it was renamed Tigress and was placed under the command of Lt. Augustus H. M. Conkling.

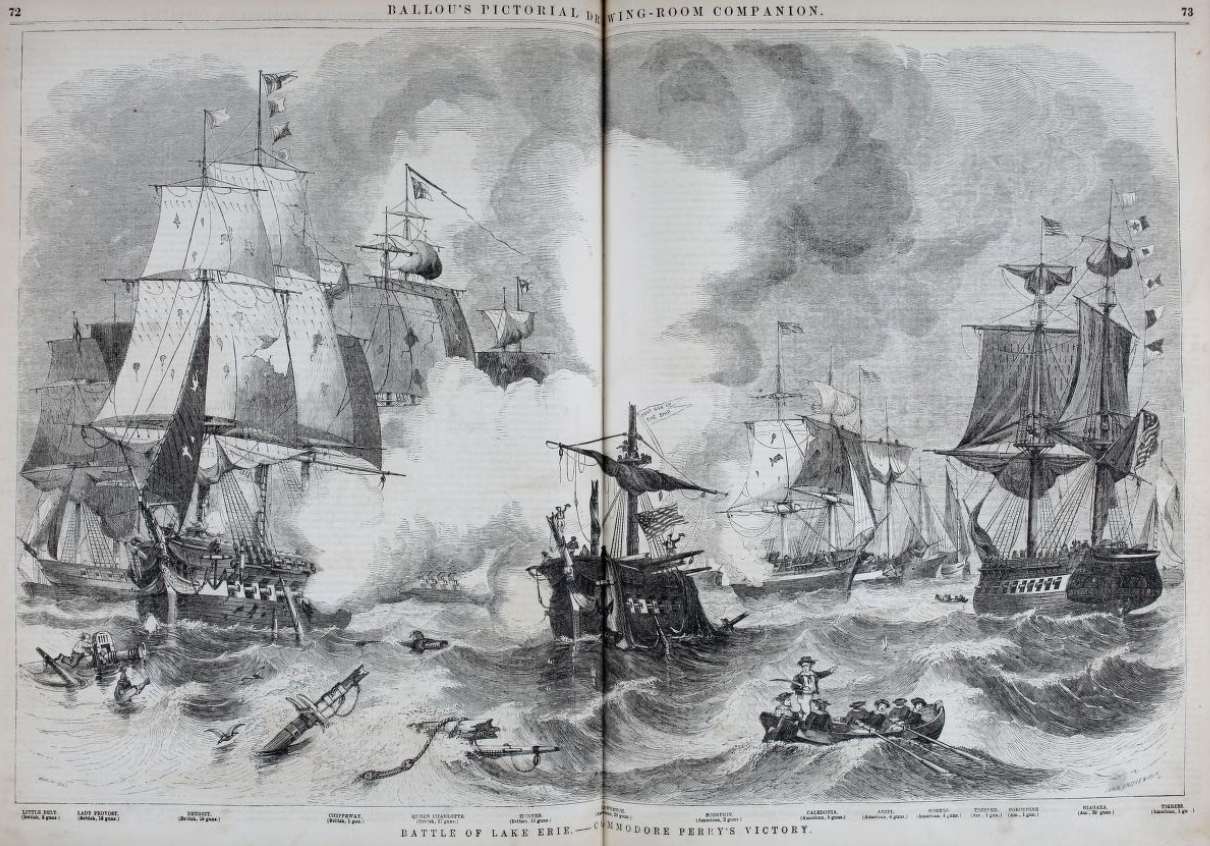
Battle of Lake Erie, Ballou's Pictorial 1856

Tigress took part in the Battle of Lake Erie at Put-in-Bay, Ohio on 10 September 1813, being one of several gunboats which caused heavy damage to HMS Detroit, the flagship of Commander Robert Heriot Barclay, and other British ships.

=== Battle of the Thames ===
Perry consequently convoyed American troops into the territory formerly held by the British, investing Malden on 23 September and Detroit (which the British had captured in 1812) four days later. On 2 October, a small naval flotilla, consisting of Tigress, Scorpion and Porcupine, under the command of Lieutenant Jesse Elliott, ascended the Thames River to support an overland expedition under General William Henry Harrison. In the ensuing Battle of the Thames, Harrison's army routed the mixed British and Indian force. The Indian leader Tecumseh was killed in the battle.

=== Lake Huron ===
Tigress subsequently sailed for Lake Huron, where she took part in blockading operations into the summer of 1814. She and Scorpion drew the task of standing watch over the entrance to the Nottawasaga River, the sole supply source for the British garrison on Mackinac Island. By early September, the situation in this town was desperate. If the blockade were not lifted within a fortnight, dwindling food supplies would force the British to surrender.

By late summer, Tigress and Scorpion were patrolling between Manitoulin Island and the Straits of Mackinac.

To break the blockade, four boatloads of British soldiers, sailors and Indigenous warriors set out from Mackinac Island on the night of 3 September 1814. Members of the Royal Newfoundland Regiment, led by Captain Andrew Bulger partook in the operation. They slipped alongside Tigress, which was anchored close inshore, and boarded the schooner. A brief and bloody battle followed and although "warmly received" by the vessel's crew, the British captured the ship in five minutes. "The defense of this vessel," wrote Lieutenant Miller Worsley, in command of the attackers, "did credit to her officers, who were all severely wounded." (This included the vessel's commander, Sailing Master Stephen Champlin.)

While the surviving officers and men were sent ashore as prisoners of war, Worsley retained the greater part of the boarding party on board and kept the ship's American flag flying. Scorpion soon arrived on 6 September and anchored some two miles distant. Worsley, in a daring stroke, ran the captured Tigress alongside Scorpion and captured her, too. Both American vessels and their captured crews were later taken to Mackinac.

=== Fate ===
The British renamed their prizes soon thereafter. Tigress became HMS Surprise, an appropriate name in view of the nature of her capture, and Scorpion became HMS Confiance. Both subsequently served the Royal Navy until the end of the war, when they were laid up and allowed to sink at their moorings in the Grand River. One of the wrecks retrieved from Penetanguishene Bay in 1953 was not Tigress, as was reported in Time Magazine, but was in fact HMS Tecumseth, which is now housed in the Tecumseth Centre located at the north end of the historical site Discovery Harbour.
