= Battle of Lake Erie =

1813 battle of the War of 1812

Coordinates: 41°39′44″N 82°49′30″W

- Part of the War of 1812
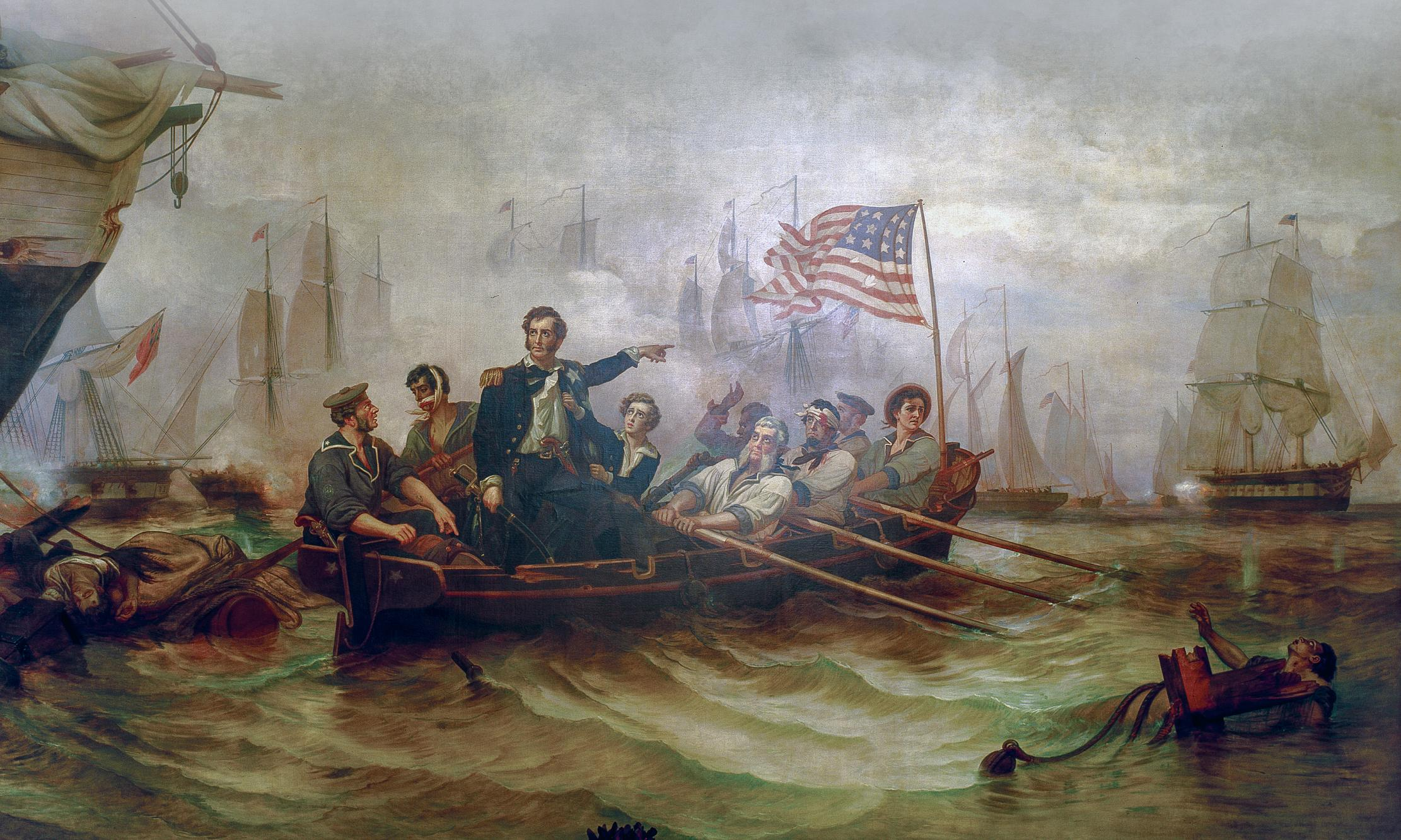
- Battle of Lake Erie; William Henry Powell, 1865 (Note: Perry's younger brother James Alexander Perry is the seated figure waving the hat. Hanibal Collins, a freed slave, is one of the oarsman.)
Date	10 September 1813
Location	Near Put-in-Bay, Ohio, Lake Erie
Result	American victory

Belligerents
United States	United Kingdom

Commanders and leaders
Oliver Hazard Perry; Jesse Elliott	Robert Heriot Barclay (surrendered); Robert Finnis †

Strength
5 schooners 3 brigs 1 sloop	3 sloops 1 brig 2 schooners

Casualties and losses
27 killed 96 wounded	41 killed 93 wounded 306 captured 3 sloops captured 2 schooners captured 1 brig captured

The Battle of Lake Erie, also known as the Battle of Put-in-Bay, was fought on 10 September 1813, on Lake Erie off the shores of Ohio during the War of 1812. Nine vessels of the United States Navy defeated and captured six vessels of the British Royal Navy. This ensured American control of the lake for the rest of the war, which in turn allowed the Americans to recover Detroit, Michigan and win the Battle of the Thames to break the Indian confederation of Tecumseh. It was one of the largest naval battles of the War of 1812.

== Background ==
=== 1812 ===
When the war broke out, the British immediately seized control of Lake Erie. They already had a small force of warships there: the sloop-of-war Queen Charlotte and the brig General Hunter. The schooner Lady Prevost was under construction and was put into service a few weeks after the outbreak of war. These vessels were controlled by the Provincial Marine, which was a military transport service and not a naval service. Nevertheless, the Americans lacked any counter to the British armed vessels. The only American warship on Lake Erie, the brig Adams, was not ready for service at the start of the war, and when the American army of Brigadier General William Hull abandoned its invasion of Canada, Adams was pinned down in Detroit by the British batteries at Sandwich on the Canadian side of the Detroit River. The British Major-General Isaac Brock used his control of the lake to defeat Hull's army at the Siege of Detroit, by cutting the American supply lines and rapidly transferring himself and some reinforcements to Amherstburg from where they launched a successful landing on the American side of the Detroit River.

The British took Adams when Detroit was surrendered, renaming her Detroit. Together with the brig Caledonia, which had been commandeered from the Canadian North West Company, she was boarded and captured near Fort Erie on 9 October, by American sailors and soldiers led by Lieutenant Jesse Elliott. Detroit ran aground on an island in the middle of the Niagara River and was set on fire to prevent her being recaptured. Caledonia was taken to the navy yard at Black Rock and commissioned into the United States Navy. Also present at Black Rock were the schooners Somers and Ohio and the sloop-rigged Trippe, which had all been purchased by the United States Navy and were being converted into gunboats. While the British held Fort Erie and the nearby batteries which dominated the Niagara River, all these vessels were pinned down and unable to leave Black Rock.

Late in 1812, Paul Hamilton, the United States secretary of the Navy, had received long-time American lake mariner Daniel Dobbins, who had escaped capture at Detroit and brought information on the British forces on Lake Erie. Dobbins recommended the bay of Presque Isle in Erie, Pennsylvania as a naval base on the lake. Dobbins was dispatched to build four gunboats there, although Lieutenant Elliott objected to the lack of facilities. Another problem was that a sand bar extended across the entrance to the harbor at Presque Isle, which would prove to make it very difficult to get newly constructed U.S. ships out to open water. In September, Dobbins began directing the cutting of trees. By November, Ebenezer Crosby, a master shipwright, was hired by Dobbins to start work on the four wooden ships. Commodore Isaac Chauncey had been appointed to the command of the United States naval forces on the Great Lakes in September 1812. He made one brief visit to Erie on 1 January 1813 where he approved Dobbins's actions and recommended collecting materials for a larger vessel, but then returned to Lake Ontario where he afterwards concentrated his energies.

=== 1813 ===
In January 1813, William Jones (who had replaced Hamilton as the United States Secretary of the Navy) ordered the construction of two brig-rigged corvettes at Presque Isle, and transferred shipwright Noah Brown there from Sackets Harbor on Lake Ontario to take charge of construction. Other than their rig and crude construction (such as using wooden pegs instead of nails because of shortages of the latter), the two brigs were close copies of the contemporary USS Hornet. The heaviest armament for the ships came from foundries on Chesapeake Bay, and were moved to Presque Isle only with great difficulty. (The Americans were fortunate in that some of their largest cannon had been dispatched shortly before raiding parties under Rear-Admiral George Cockburn destroyed a foundry at Frenchtown on the eastern seaboard.) However, the Americans could get other materials and fittings from Pittsburgh, which was expanding as a manufacturing center, and smaller guns were borrowed from the Army.

Master Commandant Oliver Hazard Perry had earlier been appointed to command on Lake Erie, through lobbying by Jeremiah B. Howell, the Senior Senator from Rhode Island, supplanting Lieutenant Elliott. He arrived at Presque Isle to take command at the end of March. Having arranged for the defense of Presque Isle, he proceeded to Lake Ontario to obtain reinforcements of seamen from Commodore Isaac Chauncey. After commanding the American schooners and gunboats at the Battle of Fort George, he then went to Black Rock where the American vessels had been released when the British abandoned Fort Erie at the end of May. Perry had them towed by draft oxen up the Niagara, an operation which took six days, and sailed with them along the shore to Presque Isle.

Meanwhile, Commander Robert Heriot Barclay was appointed to command the British squadron on Lake Erie. Another British officer had already endangered his career by refusing the appointment as success appeared unlikely. Barclay missed a rendezvous with Queen Charlotte at Point Abino and was forced to make the tedious journey to Amherstburg overland, arriving on 10 June. He brought with him only a handful of officers and seamen. When he took command of his squadron, the crews of his vessels numbered only seven British seamen, 108 officers and men of the Provincial Marine (whose quality Barclay disparaged), 54 men of the Royal Newfoundland Fencibles and 106 soldiers, effectively landsmen, from the 41st Foot. Nevertheless, he immediately set out in Queen Charlotte and Lady Prevost. He first reconnoitred Perry's base at Presque Isle and determined that it was defended by 2,000 Pennsylvania militia, with batteries and redoubts. He then cruised the eastern end of Lake Erie, hoping to intercept the American vessels from Black Rock. The weather was hazy, and he missed them.

During July and August, Barclay received two small vessels, the schooner Chippeway and the sloop Little Belt, which had been reconstructed at Chatham on the Thames River and attempted to complete the ship-rigged corvette HMS Detroit at Amherstburg. Because the Americans controlled Lake Ontario and occupied the Niagara Peninsula in early 1813, supplies for Barclay had to be carried overland from York. The American victory earlier in the year at the Battle of York resulted in the guns (24-pounder carronades) intended for Detroit falling into American hands. The shortage of supplies was also exacerbated by the British retreat of Fort George, which made it exceedingly difficult to send any other stores from Lower Canada. Detroit had to be completed with a miscellany of guns from the fortifications of Amherstburg. Barclay claimed at his court martial that these guns lacked flintlock firing mechanisms and matches, and that they could be fired only by snapping flintlock pistols over powder piled in the vent holes.

Barclay repeatedly requested men and supplies from Commodore James Lucas Yeo, commanding on Lake Ontario, but received very little. The commander of the British troops on the Detroit frontier, Major-General Henry Procter, was similarly starved of soldiers and munitions by his superiors. He declined to make an attack on Presque Isle unless he was reinforced, and instead he incurred heavy losses in an unsuccessful attack on Fort Stephenson, which he mounted at the urgings of some of his Indian warriors.

=== Blockades of Presque Isle and Amherstburg ===
By mid-July, the American squadron was almost complete, although not yet fully manned (Perry claimed to have only 120 men fit for duty). The British squadron maintained a blockade of Presque Isle for ten days from 20 to 29 July. The harbour had a sandbar across its mouth, with only 5 feet (1.5 m) of water over it, which prevented Barclay sailing in to attack the American ships (although Barclay briefly skirmished with the defending batteries on 21 July), but also prevented the Americans leaving in fighting order. Barclay had to lift the blockade on 29 July because of shortage of supplies and bad weather. It has also been suggested that Barclay left to attend a banquet in his honour, or that he wished the Americans to cross the bar and hoped to find them in disarray when he returned. Perry immediately began to move his vessels across the sandbar. This was an exhausting task. The guns had to be removed from all the boats, and the largest of them had to be raised between "camels" (barges or lighters which were then emptied of ballast). When Barclay returned four days later, he found that Perry had nearly completed the task. Perry's two largest brigs were not ready for action, but the gunboats and smaller brigs formed a line so confidently that Barclay withdrew to await the completion of Detroit.

Chauncey had dispatched 130 extra sailors under Lieutenant Jesse Elliott to Presque Isle. Although Perry described some of them as "wretched", at least 50 of them were experienced sailors drafted from USS Constitution, then undergoing a refit in Boston, Massachusetts. Perry also had a few volunteers from the Pennsylvania militia.

His vessels first proceeded to Sandusky, where they received further contingents of volunteers from Major General William Henry Harrison's Army of the Northwest. After twice appearing off Amherstburg, Perry established an anchorage at Put-in-Bay, Ohio on South Bass Island. For the next five weeks, Barclay was effectively blockaded and unable to move supplies to Amherstburg. His sailors, Procter's troops, and the very large numbers of Indian warriors and their families there quickly ran out of supplies. After receiving a last-minute reinforcement of two naval officers, three warrant officers and 36 sailors transferred from a transport temporarily laid up in Quebec under Lieutenant George Bignall, Barclay had no choice but to put out again and seek battle with Perry.

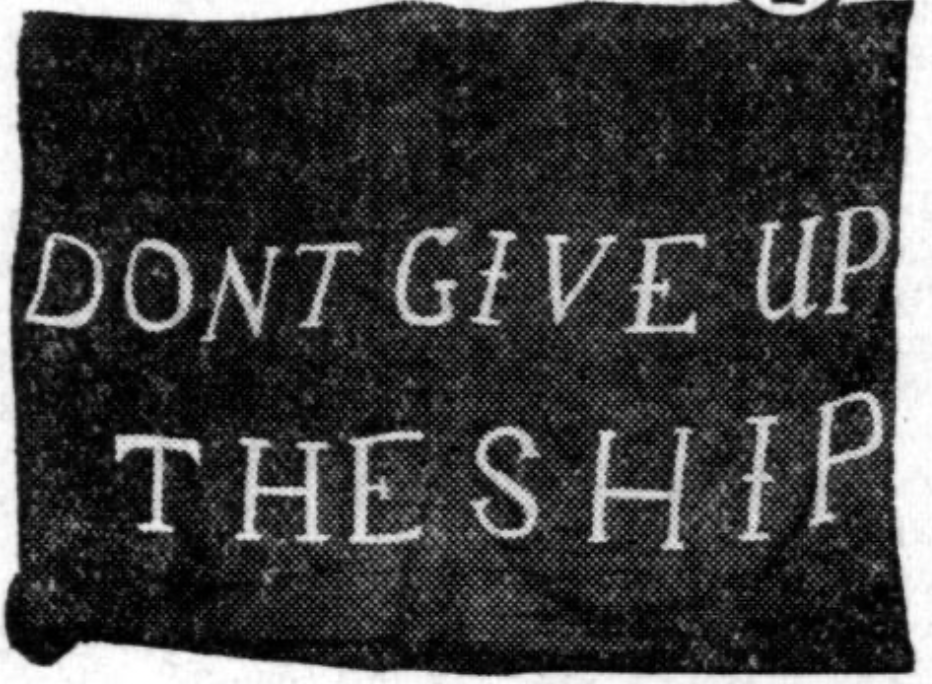

In the days preceding the battle, Perry told his friend, Purser Samuel Hambleton, that he wanted a signal flag, or battle flag, to signal to his fleet when to engage the enemy. Hambleton suggested using the dying words of Perry's friend Captain James Lawrence of the frigate USS Chesapeake, "DONT [sic] GIVE UP THE SHIP". Hambleton had the flag sewn by women of Erie, and presented it to Perry the day before the battle. The flag would become an icon in American naval history.

== Battle ==
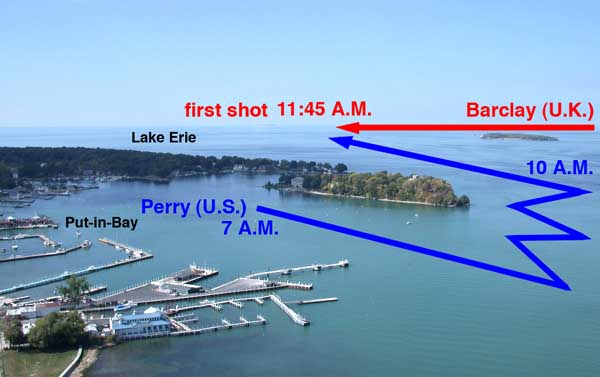
Movements of the squadrons of Perry and Barclay on the morning of 10 September overlaid on contemporary photograph (image taken September 2004)

On the morning of 10 September, the Americans saw Barclay's vessels heading for them, and got under way from their anchorage at Put-in-Bay/South Bass Island. The wind was light. Barclay initially held the weather gauge, but the wind shifted and allowed Perry to close and attack. Both squadrons were in line of battle, with their heaviest vessels near the center of the line. The first shot was fired, from Detroit, at 11:45. Perry hoped to get his two largest brigs, his flagship Lawrence and Niagara, into carronade range quickly, but in the light wind his vessels were making very little speed and Lawrence was battered by the assortment of long guns mounted in Detroit for at least 20 minutes before being able to reply effectively. When Lawrence was finally within carronade range at 12:45, her fire was not as effective as Perry hoped, her gunners apparently having overloaded the carronades with shot.

Astern of Lawrence, Niagara, under Elliott, was slow to come into action and remained far out of effective carronade range. It is possible that Elliott was under orders to engage his opposite number, Queen Charlotte, and that Niagara was obstructed by the unhandy Caledonia, but Elliott's actions would become a matter of dispute between him and Perry for many years. Aboard Queen Charlotte, the British ship opposed to Niagara, the commander (Robert Finnis) and First Lieutenant were both killed. The next most senior officer, Lieutenant Irvine of the Provincial Marine, found that both Niagara and the American gunboats were far out of range, and passed the brig General Hunter to engage Lawrence at close range.

Although the American gunboats at the rear of the American line of battle steadily pounded the British ships in the center of the action with raking shots from their long guns from a distance, Lawrence was reduced by the two British ships to a wreck. Four-fifths of Lawrence's crew were killed or wounded. Both of the fleet's surgeons were sick with "lake fever" (malaria), so the wounded were taken care of by the assistant, Usher Parsons. When the last gun on Lawrence became unusable, Perry decided to transfer his flag. He was rowed a half-mile (1 km) through heavy gunfire to Niagara while Lawrence struck her colours. It has been said his personal servant, a Black sailor named Cyrus Tiffany, accompanied and protected Perry during this journey.

A mural depiction of Perry and Cyrus Tiffany rowing to Niagara

It was later alleged that Perry left Lawrence after she struck her colours, but he had actually taken down only his personal pennant, in blue bearing the motto, "DONT [sic] GIVE UP THE SHIP". When Lawrence struck her colours, firing died away briefly. Detroit collided with Queen Charlotte, both ships being almost unmanageable with damaged rigging and almost every officer killed or severely wounded. Barclay was severely wounded and his first lieutenant was killed, leaving Lieutenant Inglis in command. Most of the smaller British vessels were also disabled and drifting to leeward. The British nevertheless expected Niagara to lead the American schooners away in retreat. Instead, once aboard Niagara, Perry dispatched Elliott to bring the schooners into closer action, while he steered Niagara at Barclay's damaged ships, helped by the strengthening wind.

Niagara broke through the British line ahead of Detroit and Queen Charlotte and luffed up to fire raking broadsides from ahead of them, while Caledonia and the American gunboats fired from astern. Although the crews of Detroit and Queen Charlotte managed to untangle the two ships they could no longer offer any effective resistance. Both ships struck at about 3:00 pm. Chippeway and Little Belt tried to flee but were overtaken and also struck. Although Perry won the battle on Niagara, he received Barclay's surrender on the deck of the Lawrence.

== Casualties ==
The British lost 41 killed and 94 wounded. The surviving crews, including the wounded, numbered 306. Captain Barclay, who had previously lost his left arm in 1809, lost a leg and part of his thigh in the action while his remaining arm was rendered "permanently motionless". The Americans lost 27 killed and 96 wounded, of whom 2 later died. The heaviest American casualties were suffered aboard Lawrence, which had 2 officers and 20 men killed, and 6 officers and 55 men wounded.

Of the vessels involved, the three most battered (the American brig Lawrence and the British ships Detroit and Queen Charlotte) were converted into hospital ships. A gale swept the lake on 13 September and dismasted Detroit and Queen Charlotte, further shattering the already battered ships. Once the wounded had been ferried to Erie, Lawrence was restored to service for 1814, but the two British ships were effectively reduced to hulks.

== Aftermath ==
Perry's vessels and prizes were anchored and hasty repairs were underway near West Sister Island when Perry composed his now famous message to Harrison. Scrawled in pencil on the back of an old envelope, Perry wrote:

Dear General:

We have met the enemy and they are ours. Two ships, two brigs, one schooner and one sloop.

Yours with great respect and esteem,
O.H. Perry (Note: The British order of battle was actually two ships, one brig, two schooners and one sloop. "Perry's message was inaccurate.")

Perry next sent the following message to the Secretary of the Navy, William Jones:

Brig Niagara, off the Western Sister,
Head of Lake Erie, 10 September 1813, 4 p.m.

Sir: – It has pleased the Almighty to give to the arms of the United States a signal victory over their enemies on this lake. The British squadron, consisting of two ships, two brigs, one schooner and one sloop, have this moment surrendered to the force under my command after a sharp conflict.

I have the honor to be, Sir, very respectfully, your obedient servant,
O. H. Perry

Once his usable vessels and prizes were patched up, Perry ferried 2,500 American soldiers to Amherstburg, which was captured without opposition on 27 September. Meanwhile, 1,000 mounted troops led by Richard Mentor Johnson moved by land to Detroit, which also was recaptured without fighting on or about the same day. The British army under Procter had made preparations to abandon its positions even before Procter knew the result of the battle. In spite of exhortations from Tecumseh, who led the confederation of Indian tribes allied to Britain, Procter had already abandoned Amherstburg and Detroit and began to retreat up the Thames River on 27 September. Lacking supplies, Tecumseh's Indians had no option but to accompany him. Harrison caught up with Procter's retreating force and defeated them on 5 October at the Battle of the Thames, where Tecumseh was killed, as was his second-in command and most experienced warrior, Wyandot Chief Roundhead.

The victory on Lake Erie had disproportionate strategic import. The Americans controlled Lake Erie for the remainder of the war. This accounted for much of the Americans' successes on the Niagara Peninsula in 1814 and also removed the threat of a British attack on Ohio, Pennsylvania, or Western New York. However, an American expedition in 1814 to recapture Mackinac Island, Michigan was repulsed with heavy casualties, and the Americans lost eight of their smaller vessels and prizes. (Four were destroyed when the British captured Black Rock, where they were laid up, following the Battle of Buffalo at the end of 1813, and four were boarded and captured in separate incidents on Lake Erie and Lake Huron.) Following the war, there was a bitter quarrel between Perry and Elliott over their respective parts in the action, mostly fought at second hand in the press.

On the British side, Barclay and his surviving officers were subject to a court-martial, which determined that they and their men had "conducted themselves in the most gallant manner" and acquitted all the officers. The court-martial found that the British defeat was the result of American numerical superiority, an insufficient number of able seamen, and senior officers becoming casualties early in the battle. However, Barclay was too badly injured to see service again for several years.

== Legacy ==
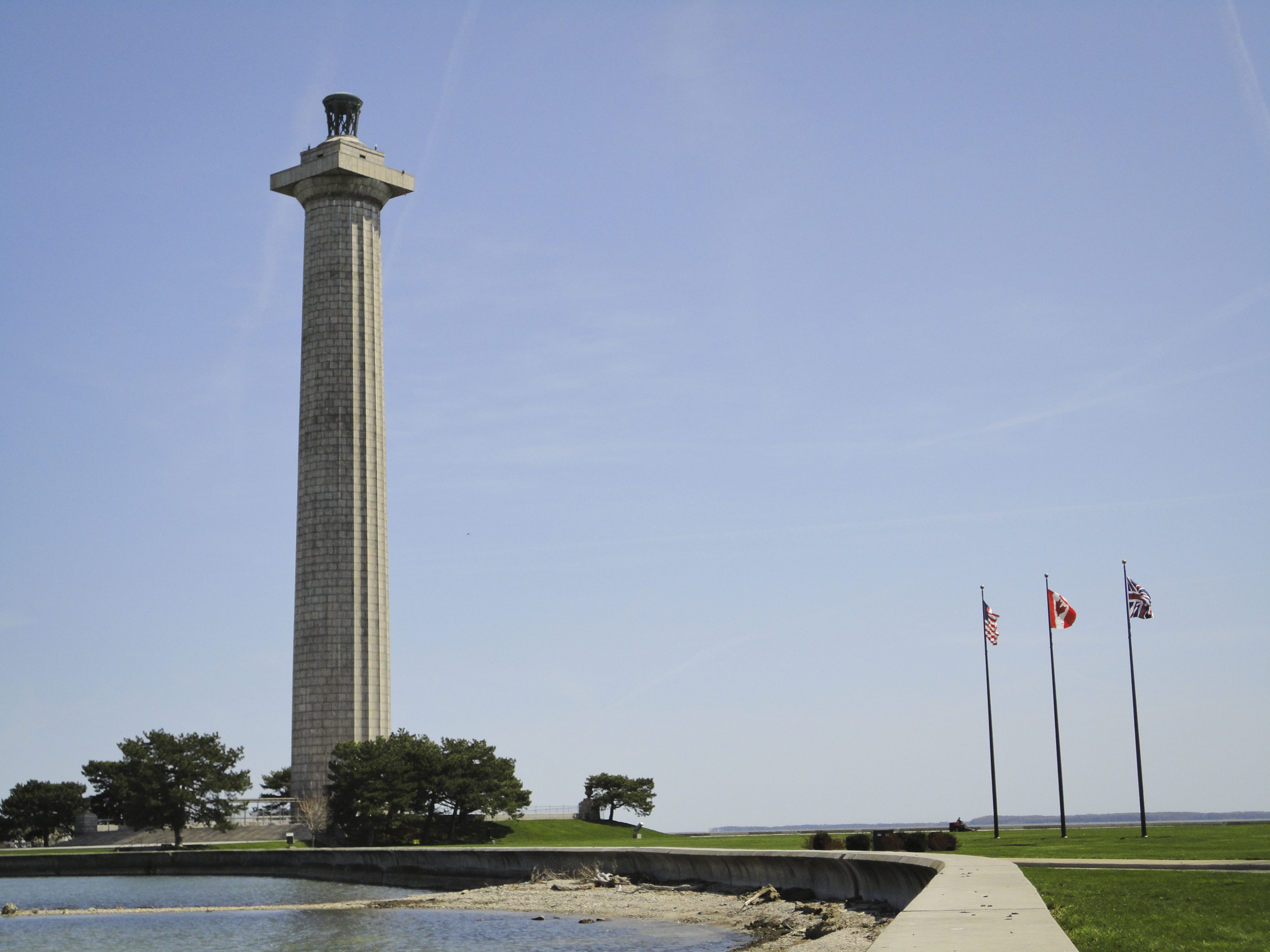
Perry's Victory and International Peace Memorial on South Bass Island

In 1820, Lawrence and Niagara were intentionally sunk near Misery Bay in Lake Erie, as they had "went to rot." In 1875, Lawrence was raised and moved to Philadelphia, where she was displayed at the 1876 Centennial Exposition. Later that year, the ship burned when the pavilion that housed it caught fire. Although Niagara was raised and restored in 1913, she subsequently fell into disrepair. She was eventually disassembled, and portions of her were used in a reconstructed Niagara, which is now on view in Erie, Pennsylvania.

The 352-foot (107 m) high Perry's Monument within Perry's Victory and International Peace Memorial now stands at Put-in-Bay, Ohio, commemorating the men who fought in the battle. Another 101-foot (31 m) high Perry Monument is located at the eastern end of Presque Isle State Park in Erie. It stands on the peninsula forming Presque Isle Bay, where Niagara and Lawrence were built, stationed along with the rest of the American Squadron, and then scuttled after the war.

Most historians attribute the American victory to what Theodore Roosevelt described as "superior heavy metal" by citing the greater numbers of American ships and heavy cannon. Perry's leadership, particularly in the latter stages of the action, is also mentioned as a factor. The British author C. S. Forester commented that "it was as fortunate for the Americans that the Lawrence still possessed a boat that would float, as it was that Perry was not hit." On the British side, William Bell served as constructor and built Detroit, which was the best-built ship on the lake. However, Detroit was built slowly, in part because of Bell's perfectionism, and indeed, it was the only purpose-built British warship constructed on Lake Erie during the war. The guns intended for Detroit were seized by the Americans at the time of their raid on Fort York the year before. That building imbalance, given the fact that six American ships were built in the same time frame, was another important cause of the American victory although it might be argued that even if Barclay had possessed more hulls, he would have been unable to obtain armament and crews for them.

== Order of battle ==
Listed in order of sailing: (Note: Vessel tonnages, rig and armament taken from Roosevelt (2004), pp. 144−145. Vessels' commanders from the same source, p. 146.)

Navy	Name	Rig	Tonnage	Crew	Armament	Commander	Notes
Royal Navy	Chippeway	Schooner	70 tons burthen	15	1 × 9-pounder long gun	Master's Mate J. Campbell	Captured
Royal Navy	Detroit	Sloop	490 tons	150	1 × 18-pounder (on swivel); 2 × 24-pounder long guns 6 × 12-pounder long guns 8 × 9-pounder long guns 1 × 24-pounder carronade 1 × 18-pounder carronade	Commander Robert Heriot Barclay	Captured
Royal Navy	General Hunter	Brig	180 tons	45	4 × 6-pounder long guns 2 × 4-pounder long guns 2 × 2-pounder long guns 2 × 12-pounder carronades	Lieutenant George Bignall	Captured
Royal Navy	Queen Charlotte	Sloop	400 tons	126	1 × 12-pounder long gun 2 × 9-pounder long guns 12 × 24-pounder carronades	Commander Robert Finnis	Captured
Royal Navy	Lady Prevost	Schooner	230 tons	86	1 × 9-pounder long gun 2 × 6-pounder long guns 10 × 12-pounder carronades	Lieutenant Edward Buchan (mortally wounded); command passed to Lieutenant Frédérick Rolette	Captured (lost rudder)
Royal Navy	Little Belt	Sloop	90 tons	18	1 × 12-pounder long gun 2 × 6-pounder long guns	Lieutenant John F. Breman	Captured
Total	6 warships		1,460 tons	450	330 lb shot from long guns 474 lb shot from carronades		
United States Navy	Scorpion	Schooner	86 tons	35	1 × 32-pounder long gun 1 × 32-pounder carronade	Sailing Master Stephen Champlin	Long gun dismounted (overcharged)
United States Navy	Ariel	Schooner	112 tons	36	4 × 12-pounder long guns	Lieutenant John H. Packet	One gun exploded (overcharged)
United States Navy	Lawrence	Brig	480 tons	136	2 × 12-pounder long guns 18 × 32-pounder carronades	Master Commandant Oliver Hazard Perry	Surrendered but not taken into possession
United States Navy	Caledonia	Brig	180 tons	53	2 × 24-pounder long guns 1 × 32-pounder carronade	Lieutenant Daniel Turner	Captured from British 9 October 1812
United States Navy	Niagara	Brig	480 tons	155	2 × 12-pounder long guns 18 × 32-pounder carronades	Master Commandant Jesse Elliott	
United States Navy	Somers	Schooner	94 tons	30	1 × 24-pounder long gun 1 × 32-pounder carronade	Lieutenant A. H. M. Conklin	
United States Navy	Porcupine	Schooner	83 tons	25	1 × 32-pounder long gun	Acting Master George Serrat	
United States Navy	Tigress	Schooner	82 tons	35	1 × 32-pounder long gun	Sailing Master Thomas C. Abny	
United States Navy	Trippe	Sloop	60 tons	35	1 × 24-pounder long gun	Lieutenant Thomas Holdup Stevens	
Total	9 warships		1,657 tons	540	288 lb shot from long guns 1,248 lb shot from carronades		
