= USS Lady Prevost =

History

United Kingdom
- Name: HMS Lady Prevost
- Builder: Amherstburg Royal Naval Dockyard
- Completed: 1810
- Captured: Surrendered to US forces 11 September 1813

United States
- Name: USS Lady Prevost
- Acquired: 11 September 1813
- Fate: Sold at auction in 1815

General characteristics
- Displacement: 230 tons
- Length: 83 ft (25 m)
- Beam: 21 ft (6.4 m)
- Draft: 9 ft (2.7 m)
- Complement: 86
- Armament: 1 × 9-pounder gun; 2 × 6-pounder guns; 10 × 12-pounder guns

USS Lady Prevost was a schooner captured from the British during the War of 1812 and pressed into use in the United States Navy.

Built in 1810 as Lady Prevost at the Canadian Provisional Marine in Amherstburg, Upper Canada, she was a 13-gun ship named for the wife of General Sir George Prevost, Commander-in-Chief of the British armies along the border between the Canadas and New York. She operated out of the Navy Island Royal Naval Shipyard.

== British service ==
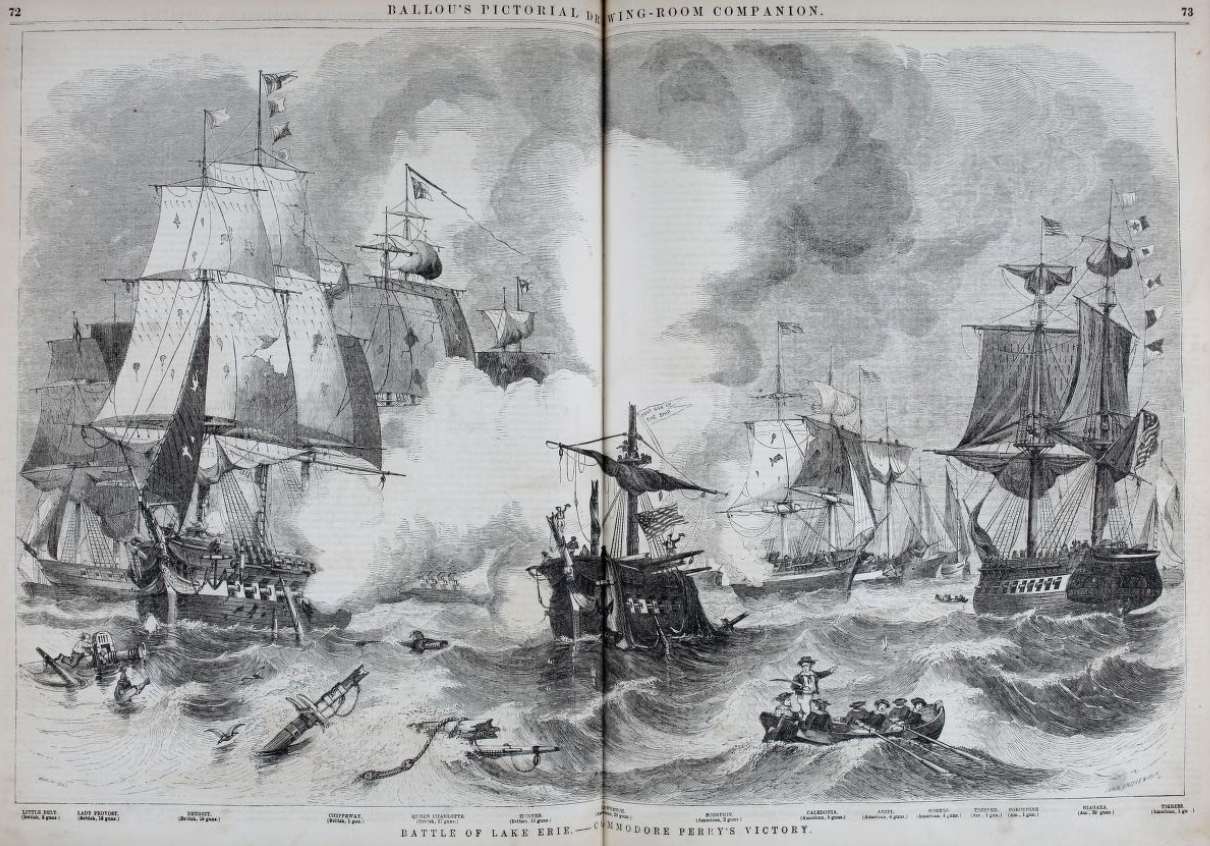
Battle of Lake Erie, Ballou's Pictorial 1856

The British schooner served as a training ship for Canadian seamen on Lake Erie through 1812, in preparation for a campaign to gain control of the Great Lakes and a subsequent invasion of the United States. Under command of Lieutenant James Buchan, RN, she was one of Captain James Barclay's squadron, which engaged the American squadron under Captain Oliver Hazard Perry off Put-in-Bay in the Battle of Lake Erie on 11 September 1813. In a gun duel first with schooners Somers, Tigress, Porcupine, and sloop Trippe, and then, as the tide of battle turned, with Perry's flagship Niagara, Lady Prevost suffered damage to her masts and superstructure, and her captain, Lieutenant James Buchan, was mortally wounded. While the ship's second-in-command, Lieutenant Frédérick Rolette continued the fight, he was also wounded in an explosion, and the vessel was compelled to surrender with the rest of her squadron.

== American service ==
Taken prize at the surrender, the schooner was repaired and joined the American squadron on Lake Erie as USS Lady Prevost. In company with Niagara, Scorpion, and Trippe under the command of Captain Jesse D. Elliott, she sailed into Lake St. Clair on 29 September to cut the supply lines of the British Army attempting to invade western New York.

For the remainder of the War of 1812, the squadron operated on Lakes Erie and Huron, cooperating with the Army commanded by General William Henry Harrison. Lady Prevost was primarily engaged in supporting American troops fighting the British and their Indian allies in the northwest.

== Disposition ==
Following the end of the war in 1815, Lady Prevost was burned and sunk by the Americans at Erie, Pennsylvania, but was raised later that year and converted into a merchantman. She was sold at public auction late in 1815.
