= Queen Charlotte (1810 ship) =

United Kingdom
- Name: Queen Charlotte
- Namesake: Charlotte of Mecklenburg-Strelitz
- Ordered: January 1809
- Builder: Amherstburg Royal Naval Dockyard, Amherstburg
- Laid down: 1809
- Launched: late 1810
- Commissioned: 1813
- Fate: Captured 10 September 1813

United States
- Name: USS Queen Charlotte
- Acquired: by capture, 10 September 1813
- Fate: Sold, 1825

United States
- Name: Queen Charlotte
- Acquired: 1825 by purchase
- Fate: Abandoned 1844

General characteristics
- Type: Ship-sloop
- Tons burthen: 254 38/95 (bm)
- Length: 92 ft 2 in (28.1 m)
- Beam: 26 ft 0 in (7.92 m)
- Depth of hold: 11 ft (3.4 m)
- Complement: 126
- Armament: 1812; 16 × 24-pounder carronades; 4 × 24-pounder long guns; 1813; 14 × 24-pounder carronades; 1 × 24-pounder long gun on a pivot; 2 × 24-pounder long guns

Queen Charlotte was the ship-rigged ship-sloop constructed for the Upper Canada Provincial Marine in 1810 as part of the fleet renewal in the lead-up to the War of 1812. Ordered in 1809, the ship was designed by Master Shipwright William Bell and constructed at Amherstburg Royal Naval Dockyard in Amherstburg, Upper Canada on Lake Erie. The design was based on the Snake class and was considered an effective design. During the War of 1812, Queen Charlotte was part of the Lake Erie squadron. After the Royal Navy took over command of the Great Lakes, Queen Charlotte was commissioned in 1813. On 10 September 1813, Queen Charlotte and the rest of the Lake Erie squadron were captured at the Battle of Lake Erie. The ship entered service with the United States Navy, though after the defeat of the British squadron, saw no further action during the war. Following the war, the ship was intentionally sunk at Put-in-Bay for preservation. Raised and sold into commercial service in 1825, the vessel continued in service until 1844, when the ship was no longer considered serviceable and left to rot as a dismasted hulk.

== Description and construction ==
In 1809, with increased threat of war with the United States, Sir James Craig, the Governor-General of British North America ordered two ships in January 1809 as part of the fleet renewal of the Upper Canada Provincial Marine. One was to be constructed on Lake Ontario, the other on Lake Erie. Queen Charlotte was the latter and the vessel's keel was laid down in mid-1809 at Amherstburg Royal Naval Dockyard at Amherstburg, Upper Canada. The design for the ship was similar to Royal George, the vessel being constructed on Lake Ontario and was initially planned to be a "corvette brig" carrying guns on one deck and capable of carrying a large number of troops. William Bell, the master shipwright at Amherstburg, requested changes to the design that extended the draught and enlarged the size of the ship from a brig. These changes were approved in October 1809. The resulting design resembled the Snake-class ship-sloops, but was 4 to 7 feet (1 to 2 m) shorter, 2 to 4 feet (1 to 1 m) narrower while retaining the flush deck and rig.

Construction was intended to be completed in 1809, however the lack of good timber and shipwrights delayed the ship's launch. During the winter months, timbers had to be brought overland, then in early 1810, the Provincial Marine vessels Earl of Camden and General Hunter were sent to Pelee Island to load cedar while shipwrights from the Provincial Marine shipyard at Kingston, Upper Canada were sent to augment those at Amherstburg. The ship was constructed of oak for the large members and hull planking, cedar for the beams and futtocks and pine for the deck planking. The ship was 92 feet 2 inches (28.1 m) long with a beam of 26 feet 0 inches (7.9 m) and a depth of hold of 11 feet 0 inches (3.4 m) and a draught of 12 feet 0 inches (3.7 m). Queen Charlotte had a displacement of 254 38/95 tons burthen and had a ship's company of 126 officers and ratings. The vessel had an initial armament of sixteen 24-pounder carronades and four 24-pounder long guns.

== Service history ==
Queen Charlotte was launched in late 1810 and with her arrival, the older Provincial Marine vessel Earl of Camden was discarded. The ship's close resemblance to Royal George was only distinguished by a stern light and railing on the quarterdeck. With the outbreak of the War of 1812, Queen Charlotte was the largest vessel in the squadron on Lake Erie. On 15 August 1812 during the Battle of Detroit, gunners of the Provincial Marine set up a battery of one 18-pounder and two 12-pounder guns and two mortars on the Canadian shore of the Detroit River and began bombarding Fort Detroit, joined by General Hunter and Queen Charlotte in the river.

With the arrival of the Royal Navy on the Great Lakes in 1813, Commander Robert Heriot Barclay was sent to command the Lake Erie squadron. Queen Charlotte was commissioned in the Royal Navy in 1813 under the command of Commander Robert Finnis. Barclay called the ship a "fine vessel" and "well-manned, would be a very effective fighting ship". However, the vessel was not well-manned with a crew of only 75 in early 1813. The ship's armament was altered in 1813, with fourteen 24-pounder carronades, one 24-pounder long gun placed on a pivot and two standard 24-pounder long guns.

=== Battle of Lake Erie ===
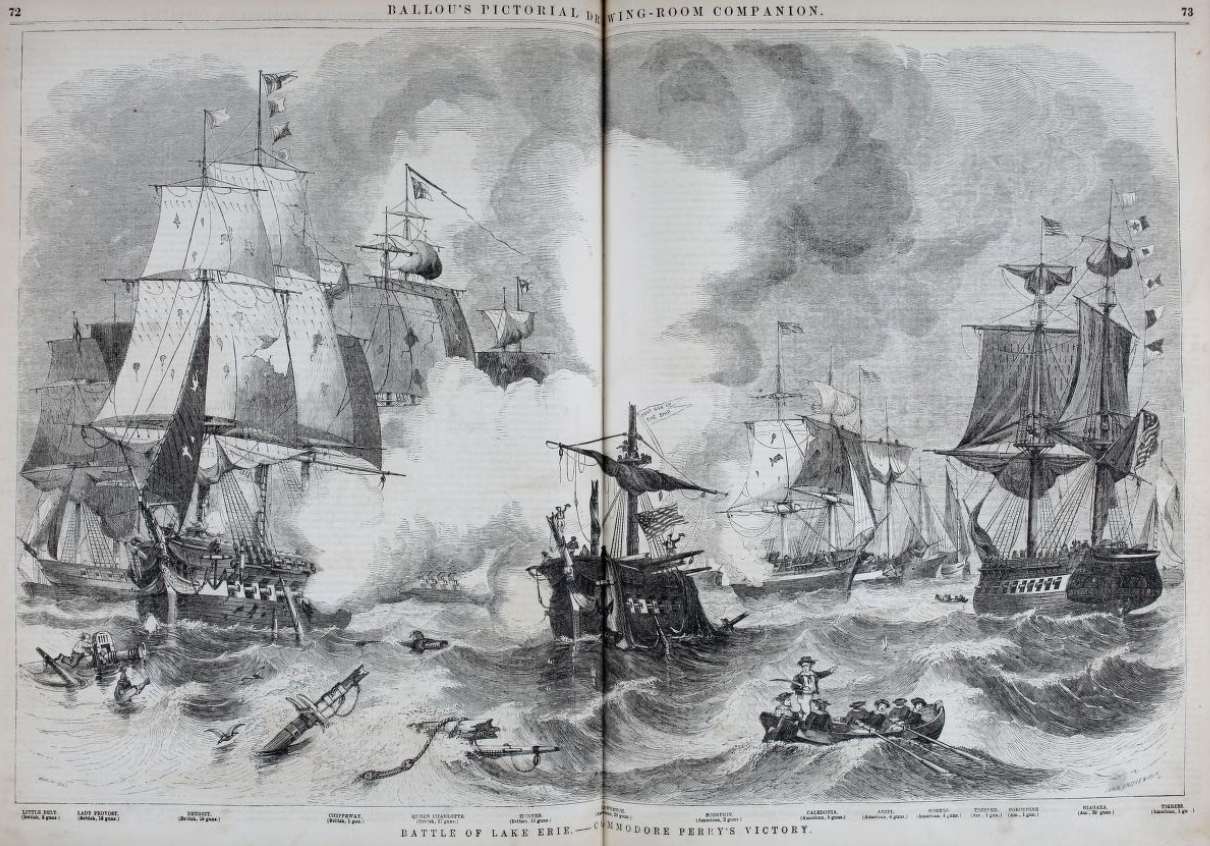
Battle of Lake Erie, Ballou's Pictorial 1856

At the time of Barclay's arrival, the Americans were constructing larger, more powerful ships at Erie in a bid to wrest control of the lake. Barclay intended to raid Erie and burn the new construction before the vessels could enter service, but was prevented from enacting the plan by the Army, which refused to give him the troops he needed. Barclay instead set up a blockade of Erie, intending to interdict the ships if they launched. Barclay put this plan in motion three days after arriving at Amherstburg. On 30 July 1813, Barclay's squadron lifted the blockade in order to resupply at Amherstburg. During his absence, the American commander, Commodore Oliver Hazard Perry launched the ships. Upon his return, Barclay saw the powerful American ships on the lake and the squadron retreated to Amherstburg to await the launch of Detroit.

At the end of July, Perry began his own blockade, preventing the water transport of supplies between Long Point and Amherstburg. This caused shortages in basic provisions among the British, and also prevented the armament and supplies meant for Detroit from arriving. After Detroit was completed, Barclay was forced to shift guns from among his active vessels in order to arm the ship and a spare set of sails from Queen Charlotte were also donated. On 9 September 1813, with Detroit added to the squadron, Barclay sailed from his anchorage in the Detroit River to break the blockade.

Queen Charlotte was located fourth in Barclay's line of battle and carried 130 crew aboard, of which fewer than 15 were sailors. Once battle was engaged between the British and Americans, Queen Charlotte faced off with Niagara. However, the distance was too great between the ships for any of the shots to be effective. As the trailing American schooners caught up to the battle, Somers began to fire on Queen Charlotte too. Both American ships concentrated their fire on the quarterdeck which led to the death of Commander Finnis and the wounding of the first lieutenant. Inexperienced Lieutenant Robert Irvine took over command of the vessel. However, he could not move into a better position to take on Niagara and Somers as they were upwind. Instead, he chose to slip around General Hunter which was third in the line and attack Perry's flagship Lawrence.

Three of the British ships now pounded Lawrence, forcing the ship out of battle and Perry to shift his flag to Niagara. Niagara then moved forward to attack Detroit but keeping out of range of Queen Charlotte. As Queen Charlotte manoeuvred to get within range, the vessel nearly collided with Detroit and the two became entangled. Niagara was then free to fire into both ships relatively unmolested. The two British ships became untangled but the damage was done and Queen Charlotte struck her colours, followed by Detroit and the rest of the squadron.

The Americans used their prizes Detroit and Queen Charlotte as hospital ships. A gale swept the lake on 13 September and dismasted both, further damaging the already battered ships. Once the wounded had been ferried to Erie, the two British ships were effectively reduced to hulks. In November Queen Charlotte was brought to Put-in-Bay and was laid up, to see no further action during the war. In 1815, Queen Charlotte, Detroit and Lawrence were all sunk at Put-in-Bay for preservation.

=== Commercial service and fate ===
In 1825 Queen Charlotte was sold to George Brown of Erie, who raised her and fitted her out as a merchant ship. Between 1842 and 1844 she was employed in the stave and timber trade. She eventually become a prey to dry rot and the elements until her owners, deeming her no longer seaworthy, left her a dismasted hulk.

== Sources ==
- "Queen Charlotte". Dictionary of American Naval Fighting Ships. Navy Department, Naval History and Heritage Command.
- Lardas, Mark (2012). Great Lakes Warships 1812–1815. New Vanguard. Oxford, UK: Osprey Publishing. ISBN 978-1-78096-048-7.
- Lardas, Mark (2017). USS Lawrence vs HMS Detroit: The War of 1812 on the Great Lakes. New York: Osprey Publishing. ISBN 978-1-4728-1582-8.
- Malcomson, Robert (2001). Warships of the Great Lakes 1754–1834. London: Chatham Publishing. ISBN 1-86176-115-5.
- Winfield, Rif (2005). British Warships in the Age of Sail 1793–1817: Design, Construction, Careers and Fates. Barnsley, UK: Seaforth Publishing. ISBN 1-86176-246-1.
