= HMS Detroit (1813) =

British naval sloop

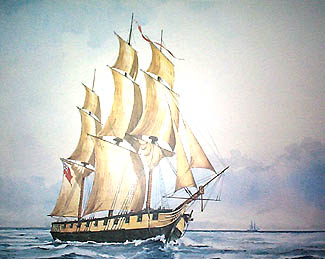
- Painting of HMS Detroit by E.A Hodgkinson

History

United Kingdom
- Name: HMS Detroit
- Builder: Amherstburg Royal Naval Dockyard, Amherstburg
- Laid down: January 1813
- Launched: mid-July 1813
- Commissioned: August 1813
- Fate: Captured on 10 September 1813

United States
- Name: USS Detroit
- Acquired: 10 September 1813 by capture
- Out of service: 1815
- Fate: Sold in 1825

History
- Name: Detroit
- Acquired: 1825
- In service: 1836
- Out of service: September 1841
- Fate: Ran aground above Niagara Falls

General characteristics as built
- Type: Sloop
- Tons burthen: 305 (bm)
- Length: 92 ft 6 in (28.2 m) pp
- Beam: 26 ft 0 in (7.9 m)
- Draught: 12 ft 0 in (3.7 m)
- Depth of hold: 11 ft 0 in (3.4 m)
- Propulsion: Sails
- Armament: Design; 4 × 12 pdr long guns; 16 × 24 pdr carronades; As built; 1 × 24 pdr carronade; 1 × 18 pdr carronade; 2 × 24 pdr long guns; 1 × 18 pdr long gun (pivot); 6 × 12 pdr long guns; 8 × 9 pdr long guns

HMS Detroit was a 20-gun sloop of the Royal Navy, launched in July 1813 and serving on Lake Erie during the War of 1812. She was the most powerful British ship in the Lake Erie squadron until the Americans captured her during the Battle of Lake Erie on 10 September 1813. Detroit was commissioned into the United States Navy as its first USS Detroit. However, she was so damaged that the sloop took no further part in the war. Postwar, Detroit was sunk for preservation at Misery Bay off Presque Isle until 1833, when she was refloated and converted for commercial service. In 1841, Detroit was reduced to a hulk at Buffalo, New York, where she was purchased with the intent of sending her over Niagara Falls. The plan went awry and Detroit ran aground on a shoal before the falls and broke up.

== Design and description ==
In November 1812, the British learned of the American plan to gain mastery over the upper Great Lakes. In response, the British ordered the construction of a new vessel at Amherstburg Royal Naval Dockyard in Amherstburg, Upper Canada. The design of the vessel was a repeat of Queen Charlotte, which itself was based on the ocean-going Cruizer-class sloops. The design was modified by Master Shipwright William Bell for service on the Great Lakes.

The ship measured 305 tons burthen (bm) and was 92 ft 6 in (28.2 m) long between perpendiculars with a beam of 26 ft 0 in (7.9 m), a depth of hold of 11 ft 0 in (3.4 m) and a draught of 12 ft 0 in (3.7 m). After capture by the Americans in 1813, the dimensions of Detroit were reported as 126 ft (38 m) long with a beam of 28 ft (8.5 m) and a draught of 12 ft, but this has been discredited as an attempt by Jesse Elliott to claim larger ships to receive larger payouts from the prize courts as it produced disproportionate measurements. The Americans give the displacement of the vessel as 400 long tons (410 t).

No design drawings remain, though from contemporary art, Detroit was seen to have a flush, corvette-style upper deck, pierced for 20 guns. The ship was designed to be armed with four 12-pounder (5.4 kg) long guns and sixteen 24-pounder (11 kg) carronades. However, due to the inability of the British to resupply Amherstburg during the War of 1812, the sloop of was armed with a mix of guns taken from other ships in the Lake Erie squadron and from Fort Malden. The hodgepodge armament was composed of one 24-pounder carronade, one 18-pounder (8.2 kg) carronade, two 24-pounder long guns, one 18-pounder long gun on a pivot, six 12-pounder (5.4 kg) long guns and eight 9-pounder (4.1 kg) long guns. At the Battle of Lake Erie, the ship had a company of 150.

== Construction and career ==
Construction of Detroit began in January 1813; however, delays began almost immediately as William Bell complained that he did not have enough shipwrights. The construction placed further burdens on British supply lines, with the vessel requiring 1,500 feet (460 m) of oak timber, 200 oak knees and over 7,000 feet (2,100 m) of pine timber and boards. Furthermore, there were shortages of fabric for sails, bolts, sheaves and deadeyes. Reinforced by shipwrights sent from Kingston, Upper Canada, planking of the sloop began in April. However, this was soon interrupted when Brigadier General Henry Procter ordered the shipwrights to concentrate their efforts on the construction of gunboats for the army.

On 27 April 1813, the guns meant for Detroit were captured at the battle of York. Commander Robert Barclay of the Royal Navy arrived in June to take command of the Lake Erie squadron. In June and July, Barclay and the Lake Erie squadron made several voyages to Long Point to await reinforcements and stores meant for Detroit. Barclay's American counterpart, Oliver Hazard Perry was also constructing newer, more powerful ships at Put-in-Bay and these were completed before Detroit became operational. Barclay was forced to retreat to Amherstburg to await Detroit's completion. In the meantime, the Perry blockaded Long Point, preventing further supplies from reaching Amherstburg.

As the situation at Amherstburg became untenable, Procter and Barclay agreed that Barclay would have to challenge Perry's American squadron. Detroit launched in mid-July and was commissioned into the Royal Navy in August as Barclay's flagship. Without the guns that were captured at York, Barclay was forced to arm Detroit with a mix of guns pulled from other vessels in the squadron and Fort Malden. The guns themselves were not in optimal condition, as they lacked flintlocks and required alternative and less dependable means for firing them. For sails, a spare set from Queen Charlotte was used. Furthermore, there was a lack of sailors in the squadron, with crews being filled out with soldiers from Procter's army.

=== Battle of Lake Erie ===
Barclay and his squadron set sail from Amherstburg on 9 September 1813, intending to bring the American squadron to battle. The two forces met on 10 September, and Detroit, which was second in Barclay's line of battle, squared up with Perry's flagship Lawrence. Detroit began that battle with a single shot from its 24-pounder long gun directed at Lawrence. It missed, but Detroit's second shot hit. Lawrence and the schooners Ariel and Scorpion engaged Detroit, with Lawrence exchanging broadsides with Detroit. Queen Charlotte moved up the battle line and added her guns to Detroit's in battering Lawrence, eventually knocking the American ship out of the battle. This forced Perry to shift his command to Niagara.

By this point, Barclay had been injured, and command of Detroit had passed to Lieutenant George Inglis. After Perry had shifted to Niagara, he moved the vessel up the American battle line, and closer to Detroit in order to engage the British flagship. Detroit began firing at Niagara, but by this point was heavily damaged and the crew tired, unlike Niagara which had, to this point, barely taken part in the battle. Niagara moved to pass in front of Detroit's bow in order to rake the British ship. Queen Charlotte, to this point unable to engage Niagara, attempted to get into a position to attack the American vessel. However, in doing so, she became entangled in Detroit's yardarms, locking the two vessels together and immobilizing them. Niagara continued to fire on the two British ships while they tried to disentangle themselves, causing considerable damage. After untangling, Queen Charlotte struck her colours, followed by Detroit and the rest of the British squadron.

=== American service ===
The British prizes were taken to Put-in-Bay and laid up to prevent the ship from sinking. The Americans used their prizes Detroit and Queen Charlotte as hospital ships. A gale swept the lake on 13 September and dismasted both, further damaging the already battered ships. Once the wounded had been ferried to Erie, Pennsylvania, the two British ships were effectively reduced to hulks. In May 1814 Ohio assisted in fitting out prizes Detroit and Queen Charlotte at Put-in Bay, and convoyed them to Erie in November. There the vessels were used as receiving ships for the rest of the war.

Following ratification of the Treaty of Ghent in 1815, the Americans submerged Detroit at Misery Bay off Presque Isle Bay in order to preserve the ship. In 1816 the Rush-Bagot Treaty, which demilitarized the Great Lakes, came into effect; the treaty limited each nation to two warships on the upper Great Lakes. On 8 August 1825 the US government closed the Lake Erie station and sold the submerged Detroit and other vessels to the merchant Benjamin H. Brown of Rochester, New York. He did nothing with them until 20 June 1836 when he sold them to George Miles of Erie. Miles raised Detroit and fitted the vessel out as a trading barque. She worked on the Great Lakes until 1841, when she was laid up at Buffalo, New York, as a hulk.

=== Fate ===
A group of merchants purchased the hulk in September 1841, intending to create a spectacle at Niagara Falls. They had her re-rigged to sail and set her loose atop Niagara Falls hoping that she would go over the falls to smash at their base. However, Detroit ran aground on a shoal before reaching the falls. Detroit eventually broke up on site.
