= Cyrus Tiffany =

American sailor (1738–1818)

- "Cyrus Tiffany in the Battle of Lake Erie, September 13, 1813," mural by Martyl Schweig Langsdorf
- Born: 1738
- Died: 1818 (aged 79–80)
- Burial place: At sea
- Military career
- Allegiance: United States
- Branch: United States Navy
- Conflicts: War of 1812; Battle of Lake Erie

Cyrus Tiffany (1738–1818), sometimes recorded as Silas Tiffany, was an African-American fifer and sailor who served in the War of 1812 under Oliver Hazard Perry. In the Battle of Lake Erie on September 10, 1813, Tiffany is said to have heroically shielded Perry as they transferred command from the damaged USS Lawrence to the USS Niagara.

== Early life ==
It is believed that Tiffany was born in 1738 to Nathan Tiffany and Sarah Harvey and later served in the American Revolutionary War. Tiffany was accomplished at the fife and he may have performed in the tent of George Washington.

He then lived as a free black man in Taunton, Massachusetts with his wife and son. It is in Taunton that he met Oliver Hazard Perry.

== Battle of Lake Erie ==
By the time of the War of 1812, Tiffany was an elderly man known as "Old Tiffany" and served as Commodore Perry's personal servant. During the tumultuous battle on Lake Erie, Perry commanded Tiffany to stand with a musket on the berth deck and make sure no soldiers avoided fighting by staying below deck.

After staying by Perry's side for the full battle, Tiffany continued to serve with Perry. Some accounts say he stayed with Perry until Perry's death in 1819, while other records show that Tiffany died aboard the USS Java in 1818 and was buried at sea.

It has been estimated that approximately 10 percent of the sailors aboard Perry's ships were black men. Because of their experience in maritime trades, African Americans possessed skills that greatly helped Perry's campaign on Lake Erie. Other black sailors in the battle include Jesse Williams and Newport Hazard, who were both wounded in action. Several others were killed, including Jesse Walls and Isaac Hardy. Those who survived had varying experiences later — Williams was given a silver medal from the state of Pennsylvania for his service, but ship boy Jack Russell had to turn over his prize money to his master George Mason upon returning home.

== Legacy ==
Tiffany's actions are rarely mentioned in general tellings of the Battle of Lake Erie. Around 1943, a mural including Tiffany next to Perry was painted by Martyl Langsdorf in the Recorder of Deeds building in Washington, D.C. More recently, scholars such as Henry Louis Gates Jr. and Gene Allen Smith have included him in their research.
