= Usher Parsons =

American physician (1788-1868)

- Born: August 18, 1788; Alfred, Maine, U.S.
- Died: December 19, 1868 (aged 80); Providence, Rhode Island, U.S.
- Burial place: Providence, Rhode Island, U.S.
- Education: Harvard Medical School (MD)
- Occupation: Surgeon
- Spouse: Mary J. Holmes (m. 1822; died 1825)
- Children: 1
- Relatives: Abiel Holmes (father-in-law); Oliver Wendell Holmes Sr. (brother-in-law); Oliver Wendell Holmes Jr. (nephew)
- Awards: Rhode Island Heritage Hall of Fame (2002)
- Military career
- Allegiance: United States
- Branch: United States Navy
- Rank: Surgeon
- Conflicts: War of 1812

Usher Parsons (August 18, 1788 – December 19, 1868) was an American naval surgeon and physician. After working as a schoolteacher and farmer, he was licensed to practice medicine and enlisted as an assistant surgeon in the United States Navy during the War of 1812. He was acting lead physician on the USS Lawrence during the Battle of Lake Erie. After obtaining his MD from Harvard Medical School, he retired from the navy, served as chair of anatomy and surgery in Dartmouth College and Brown University, and wrote The Life of Sir William Pepperrell, Bart (1855).

== Biography ==
=== Early life and education ===
Parsons was born on August 18, 1788, in Alfred, located in the District of Maine. He was the youngest of the nine children of Abigail Frost (née Blunt) and William Parsons, the latter of whom was a selectman and the town clerk of Alfred, as well as a farmer. He was named after John Usher, a relative who served as lieutenant-governor of the Province of New Hampshire.

Parsons studied at a local school and Berwick Academy, spending around a year in the latter before graduating. He worked as a schoolteacher in Alfred, Berwick, and Kittery, as well as the family farm.

Parsons started studying medicine under Abiel Hall in 1807 and visited a 1809 anatomical lecture from Alexander Ramsay. After studying Latin and Greek in the household of Moses Sweat of Sanford, Maine, he studied medicine under Hall, Joseph Kittridge, and John Warren. the last of whom under he completed his apprenticeship. The Massachusetts Medical Society licensed him to practice medicine in 1812.

=== Naval career ===
Finding a way to pay for debt, Parsons wanted to join the United States Army as a commission-paid assistant surgeon; despite an initial lack of success, he was commissioned to the same position in the Navy after the United States declared war on the United Kingdom, starting the War of 1812. He was the lead physician for the soldiers at Black Rock, New York, where he dealt with an epidemic of pleuropneumonia. Parsons spoke of his experiences sailing with Oliver Hazard Perry's squadron in August 1813, where he said that seeing the other medical officers sick meant that "we met the enemy".

Parsons became acting lead physician on the USS Lawrence during the Battle of Lake Erie. Working in the wardroom of the relatively-small Lawrence, he would often witness cannonballs attack the area, with two of his recovering patients being killed and another cannonball missing Parsons himself. He continued to treat the wounded as Commodore Perry fought the British with the flag containing the words "DONT [sic] GIVE UP THE SHIP".

Parsons was promoted to surgeon on April 15, 1814. After serving as a surgeon for a Pennsylvania militia involved in the failed Battle of Mackinac Island, he moved to the USS Java as their crew physician, and was present with them when they were combating piracy in the Second Barbary War. He then sailed on the USS Guerriere in 1818. Later based at the Boston Navy Yard, he started a period of extended leave from the Navy in 1822, and retired altogether the next year.

=== Academic and writing career ===
While returning home briefly to the United States, Parsons obtained an MD from Harvard Medical School in 1818; his dissertation was about the 1812–1813 Lake Erie pneumonia epidemic. In 1820, he published a medical handbook for merchant ship boarders named The Sailor's Physician. At Dartmouth College, he was the chair of anatomy and surgery from 1820 until 1822.

Practicing medicine with Levi Wheaton in Providence, Rhode Island, in the 1820s, Parsons later joined him in Brown University afterwards, becoming a professor of anatomy and surgery in 1822. He also became chair of anatomy and surgery at Brown in 1823. He remained active in medicine after Brown's medical school was suspended in 1827. He served as president of the Rhode Island Medical Society several times, as well as vice-president of the American Medical Association. He also co-founded the Rhode Island Hospital and the Providence Medical Society.

Parsons frequently wrote about medicine, including intravenous therapy, periostitis, and skin and spinal disease. He won the Rhode Island Medical Society's Fiske Fund Prize Dissertation Award and four Boylston Prize Dissertation Medals from Harvard University. He also wrote about folklore, history, toponymy, and military studies, with his work including a book, The Life of Sir William Pepperrell, Bart (1855), as well as Brief Sketches of the Officers Who Were in the Battle of Lake Erie, published in the January 1863 issue of The New England Historical and Genealogical Register.

Outside of medicine, Parsons was a real estate landlord, with his holdings in his native Rhode Island, Illinois, and Ohio.

=== Personal life, death, and legacy ===
Parsons married Mary J. Holmes, daughter of clergyman and historian Abiel Holmes, on September 23, 1822. Through this relationship, he was the brother-in-law of poet Oliver Wendell Holmes Sr., as well as a paternal uncle of Supreme Court justice Oliver Wendell Holmes Jr.. Parsons and his wife had one son, physician and Brown University professor Charles William Parsons, and were married until her death in 1825.

While touring European medical clinics on sick leave from the Guerriere, Parsons met the English anatomist Richard Owen, afterwards becoming a long-time friend and pen pal of his. While in Paris around that time, he also purchased a stethoscope from René Laennec, and met Guillaume Dupuytren and Dominique Jean Larrey. He kept a personal letter from Oliver Hazard Perry commending his work in the Battle of Lake Erie as "of his proudest possessions".

Parsons died on December 19, 1868, in Providence, where he was then buried. In 1870, a Memoir of Usher Parsons, M.D. written by his son was released. In 1988, Seebert J. Goldowsky published an annotated biography of Parsons, Yankee Surgeon: The Life and Times of Usher Parsons (1788–1868). In 2002, he was inducted into the Rhode Island Heritage Hall of Fame, which called him "Rhode Island’s foremost physician of the early 19th century". His diaries are held in the John Hay Library.
