= USS Trippe (1812) =

Sloop-of-war of the United States Navy

History

United States
- Name: USS Trippe
- Acquired: Purchased, 1812
- Fate: Captured and burned, October 1813

General characteristics
- Type: Sloop
- Displacement: 60 long tons (61 t)
- Complement: 35 officers and enlisted
- Armament: 1 × 32-pounder long gun

USS Trippe was a sloop in the United States Navy during the War of 1812. She was named in honour of John Trippe.

Originally named Contractor, she was purchased by the Navy on the Niagara River in New York in 1812 — was converted to a warship by Henry Eckford of New York; renamed Trippe; and placed in commission soon thereafter, Lieutenant Thomas Holdup Stevens in command.

For a while, Trippe and her sister ships, fitted out on the Niagara River, were bottled up by British shore batteries at Fort George. However, Commodore Isaac Chauncey's squadron joined the troops under Colonel Winfield Scott in a combined attack upon the fort, and it fell on 27 May 1813. The fall of Fort George forced the British to evacuate Fort Erie as well. With the river open, Chauncey's ships began passage of the Niagara rapids on 6 June 1813 and, on the 19th joined Oliver Hazard Perry's fleet at Erie, Pennsylvania.

Trippe and the rest of Perry's squadron remained at Erie for another month. At first, the need for additional men to complete its crews kept the fleet in port. Later, a British blockade restricted its movement. However, the British were not exceedingly vigilant; and, on 4 August, Trippe and the other ships crossed the bar to leave Erie harbor. They remained near Erie until the 12th when they set sail for the western end of Lake Erie.

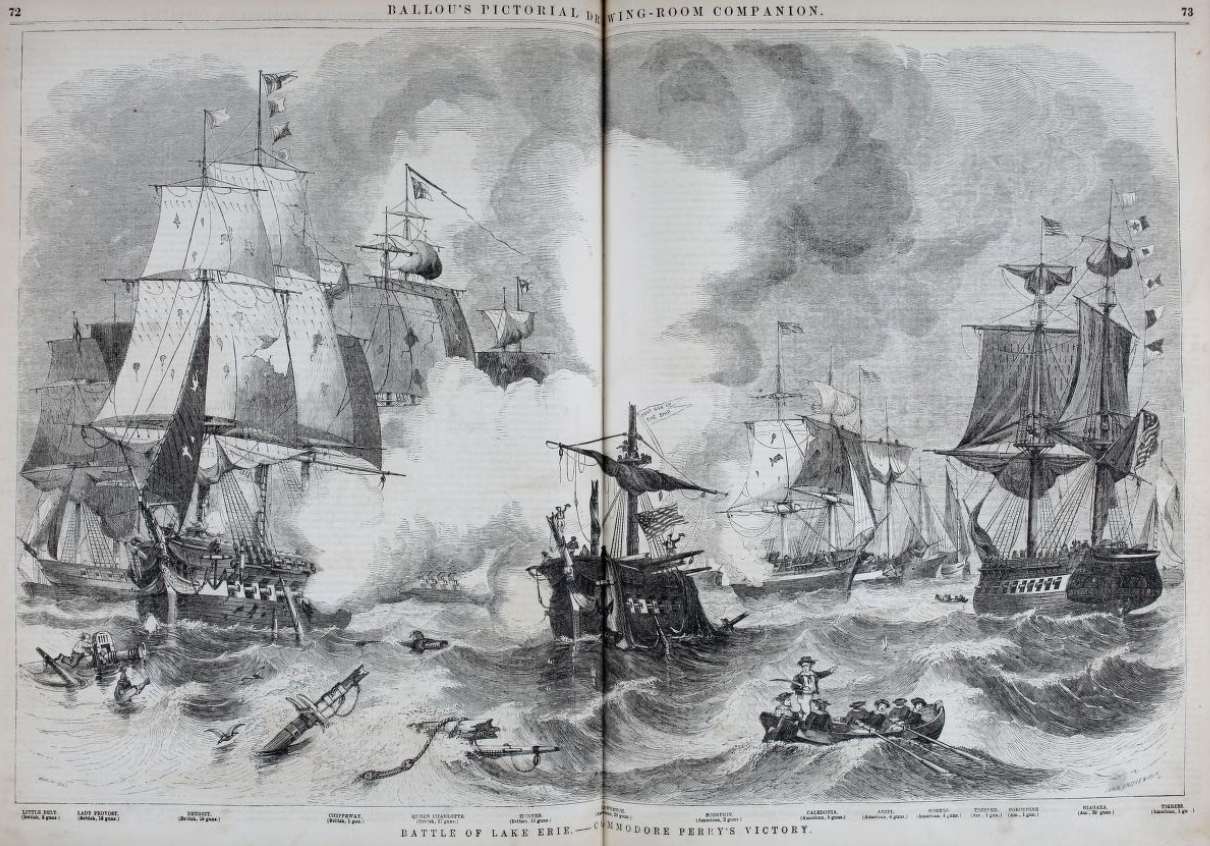
Battle of Lake Erie, Ballou's Pictorial 1856

Perry established his operating base in Put-In-Bay at South Bass Island. That location afforded him excellent lines of communications with American forces to the south and put him within easy striking distance of Commodore Robert Barclay's British fleet, based just inside the mouth of the Detroit River at Amherstburg.

For over a month, the British ships remained at their base under the protection of heavy shore batteries. However, Barclay had to order his ships out of the river in order that supplies might be delivered to British troops operating near the Detroit River. They weighed anchor on 9 September and departed Amherstburg. At sunrise the following morning, American lookouts sang out, "Sail ho." Perry's ships, including Trippe, cleared for action and headed out in the line of battle with flagship Lawrence in the lead. Though they outnumbered the British nine ships to six, the Americans were outgunned 54 to 63.

By midday, the two forces opened fire. The British concentrated on the lead American ships, Lawrence, Caledonia, and Niagara. Meanwhile, Trippe — stationed near the rear of the American force — fought a long range duel with Lady Prevost and Little Belt, battering Lady Prevost severely. The Britisher's captain and her first lieutenant received serious wounds, and she herself, reduced to an unmanageable wreck, fell off to leeward. Perry's flagship suffered similar damage, but he moved his flag to Niagara and ordered his ships forward, through the enemy line. Trippe charged ahead, firing furiously. The British resisted the American onslaught heroically, but—one by one—they struck their colors. When Chippeway and Little Belt attempted to flee, Trippe and Scorpion overhauled them and herded them back to their defeated fleet.

The Battle of Lake Erie, Trippe's only action in the War of 1812, assured American control of Lake Erie and enabled American troops led by General William Henry Harrison to win a decisive victory in the Battle of the Thames. Throughout the remainder of her career, Trippe carried supplies to support General Harrison's land operations. In October, the British attacked Buffalo at the east end of the lake and forced the Americans to evacuate the city. They found Trippe aground near Buffalo Creek and set fire to her. She and her cargo of supplies burned completely.
