= HMS Chippeway =

British sailboat

History

Great Britain / Upper Canada
- Name: Chippawa
- Namesake: Chippawa Creek
- Builder: Anderson Martin, Chippawa, Ontario Canada
- Launched: 1810

United Kingdom
- Name: HMS Chippawa
- Acquired: 1812
- Captured: 10 September 1813

United States
- Name: USS Chippewa
- Acquired: 10 September 1813 (by capture)
- Fate: Grounded by storm; burned by British in December 1813

General characteristics
- Type: Schooner
- Tons burthen: 30-70 (Note: Records differ. Mansfield reports her burthen as 30 tons. Hepper says 32 tons. DANFS says 70.); 7975/95 (by calc; bm)
- Length: 59 ft (18.0 m) (Note: All dimensions are from Silverstone.)
- Beam: 16 ft (4.9 m)
- Depth of hold: 7 ft (2.1 m)
- Propulsion: Sails
- Sail plan: Schooner
- Complement: 15; 27 as HMS Chippeway
- Armament: British service: 1 × 9-pounder gun; American service: 1 × 12-pounder gun + 2 × swivels, or 1 × 18-pounder gun + 2 swivels

HMS Chippawa, or Chippeway, was the mercantile schooner Chippawa, built and launched in 1810. The British brought her into service as HM Schooner Chippawa, sometimes recorded as Chippeway.

The United States later captured her at the Battle of Lake Erie, and brought her into service, as USS Chippewa. A storm drove her aground in October 1813, where a British force burned her in December.

== Career ==
The small merchant schooner Chippawa, built in Chippawa, Ontario, Canada, in 1810, was under the command of her builder Captain Anderson Martin or perhaps his brother Capt. Budd Martin, and trading on the Great Lakes. At the outbreak of the War of 1812 she was ferrying supplies and furs. The British initially armed Chippawa with two guns, and brought her into the Provincial Marine under the command of Lieutenant Rollette. During the one-month armistice in August 1812, Chippawa carried General Isaac Brock on Lake Erie.

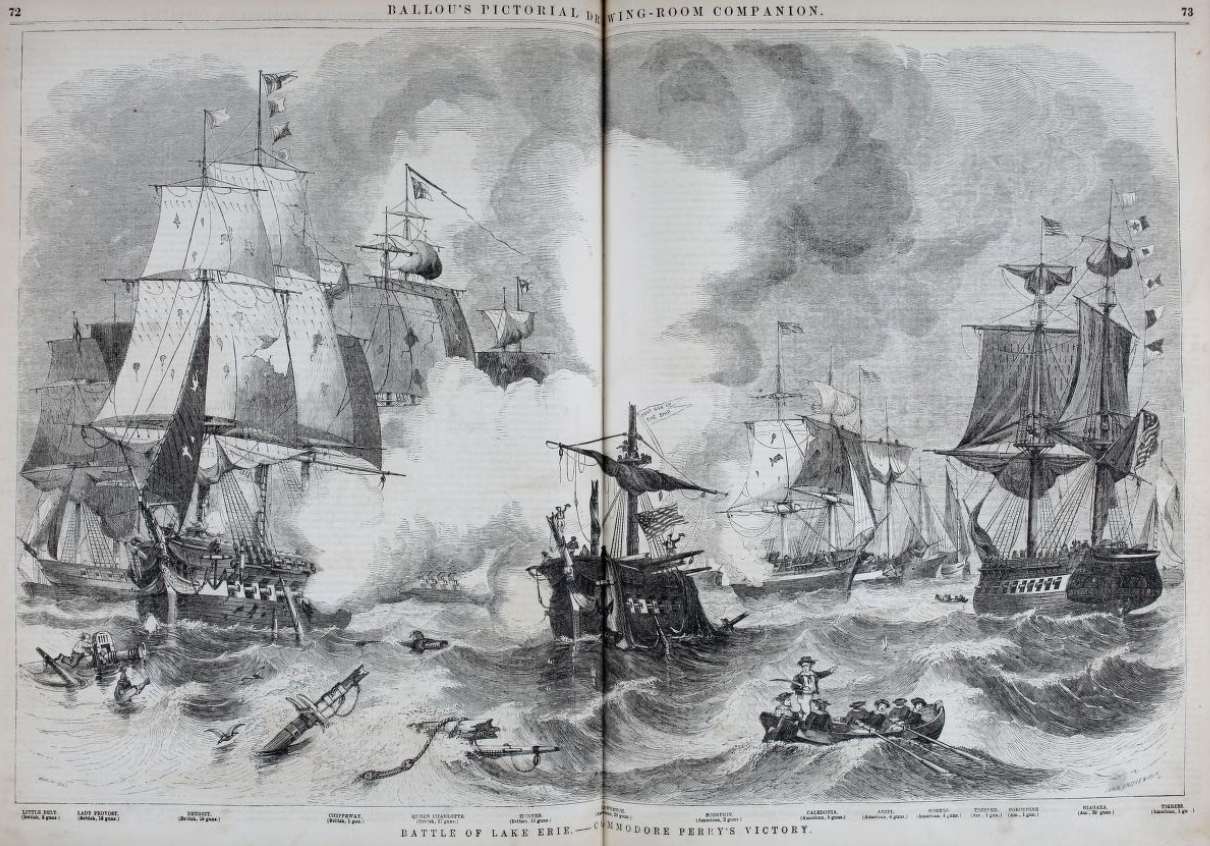
Battle of Lake Erie, Ballou's Pictorial 1856

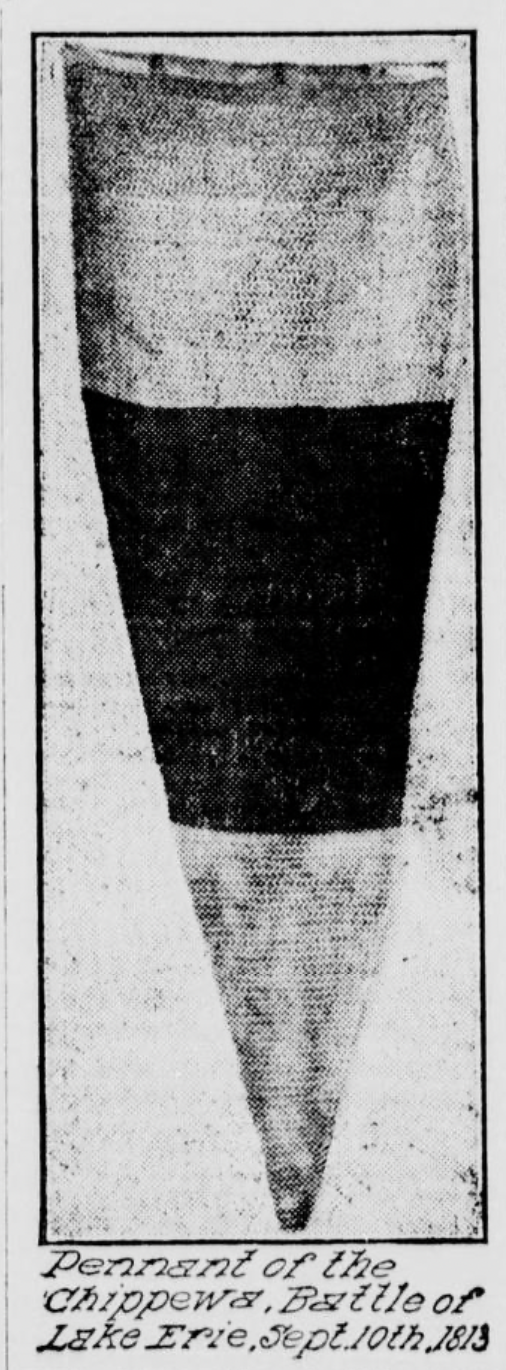
Ship's Pennant captured by the Americans

She was armed with only one gun and under the command of Master's Mate J. Campbell when on 10 September 1813 the American sloop Trippe captured her during the Battle of Lake Erie. The Americans concentrated their fire on the larger British vessels and Chippawa came under fire when she went to help them. The Americans then captured her and Little Belt while they were trying to escape. Her only casualty was Campbell, who was slightly wounded in the action.

The Americans took her into service as USS Chippewa, under the command of Acting Midshipman Robert S. Tatem. She then carried the baggage of the 27th and 28th regiments of Infantry from Put-in-Bay, Ohio.

== Fate ==
A storm on 12 October drove Chippewa ashore near Buffalo. A later storm on 25–26 October drove Little Belt, Trippe, and Ariel ashore too at Buffalo. All efforts to refloat them failed, and on 30 December the British landing party that captured the Navy yard at Black Rock, New York (now a neighborhood of Buffalo), burned them during the Battle of Buffalo.
