= USS Somers (1812) =

History

United States
- Name: USS Somers
- Namesake: Richard Somers
- Acquired: Purchased for $5,500 in 1812
- Fate: Captured by the British, 12 August 1814

United Kingdom
- Name: HMS Huron
- Namesake: Sauk people
- Acquired: Captured 12 August 1814

General characteristics
- Type: Schooner
- Displacement: 87 tons
- Propulsion: Sail
- Armament: 1 gun

USS Somers was a schooner, formerly Catherine, purchased by the United States Navy in 1812. She was purchased for $5,500 from Jacob Townsend, a pioneer and one of the first settlers of Lewiston, New York and purveyor of goods on the Great Lakes. She fought in the War of 1812 under the command of Commodore Oliver Hazard Perry on Lake Erie and Lake Huron, and took part in the capture of the British Squadron on 10 September 1813. She was captured by the British in 1814, and taken into service as HMS Huron.

== Service history ==
When purchased, she was penned up in the Niagara River during the spring of 1813 by powerful British batteries which commanded the river from its Canadian bank at Fort Erie.

Late in May, an American joint Army-Navy operation captured Fort George. This victory enabled Perry to get Somers, the brig Caledonia, and three other schooners out from the Niagara to the open waters of Lake Erie. The American ships proceeded along the southern shore of the lake to Presque Isle, where Perry had been constructing more powerful warships, brigs Lawrence and Niagara.

However, the draft of the new American vessels was too great for them to sail easily across the bar off Presque Isle to Lake Erie. Perry's problem was further complicated by the fact that the British fleet, under Commodore Robert Heriot Barclay, cruised off the American base, ready to attack any United States ship which attempted to emerge. Of course, the bar, which prevented the Americans from getting out, also kept Barclay's fleet from entering the harbor to destroy Perry's squadron.

Barclay ended the stalemate on 2 August when he sailed away from Presque Isle. Perry took full advantage of the opportunity by landing Lawrence's guns and using two large scows as pontoons to further lift the brig. On the morning of 5 August, just after Lawrence had crossed the bar and before her guns had been replaced, the British fleet reappeared. Somers and her sister schooners sailed out and opened fire on the enemy. However, Barclay, not realizing that Lawrence was helpless, replied with a few rounds at the schooners and retired.

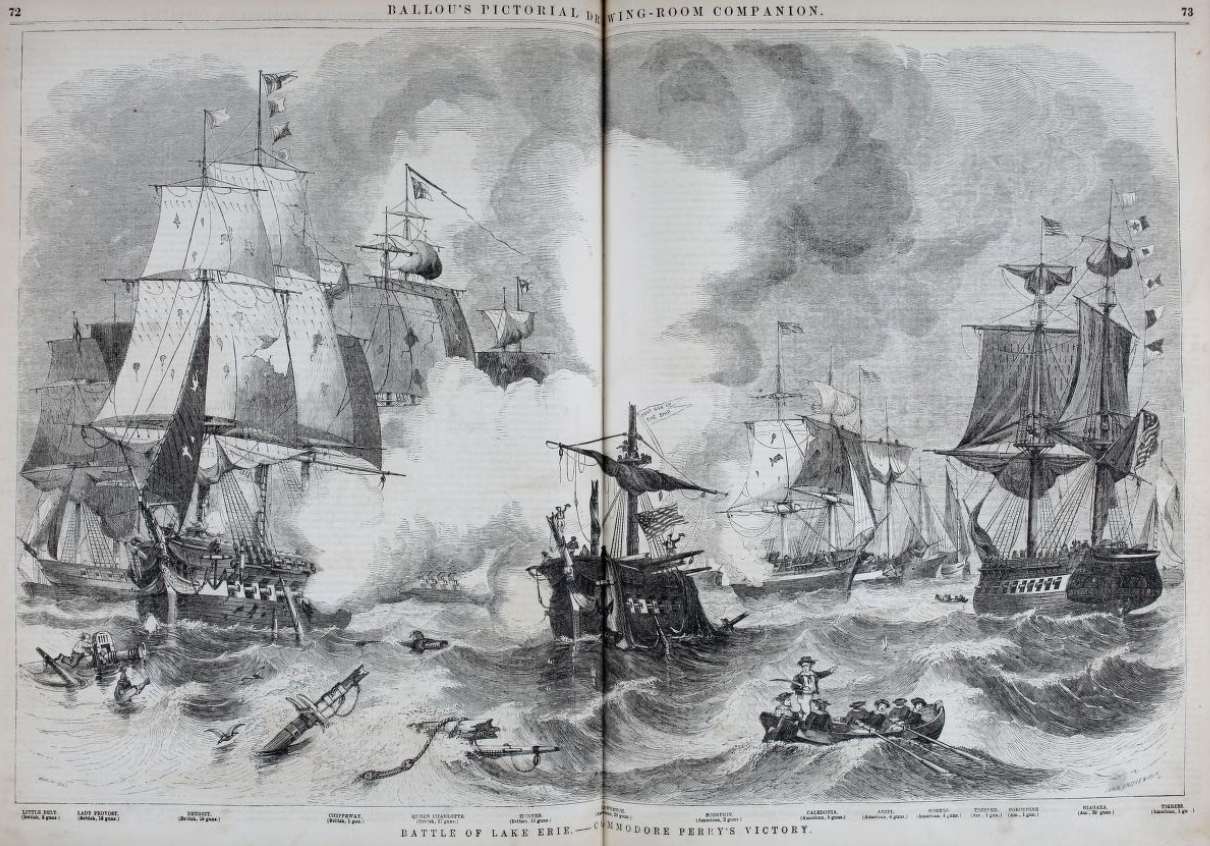
Battle of Lake Erie, Ballou's Pictorial 1856

Once Perry had both brigs-rearmed and ready for battle on the lake, the stage was set for trial by combat. Perry sailed his squadron to Put-in-Bay where he could threaten the British General Procter's line of supply and communications, keeping an eye on Barclay's ships at Fort Maiden, Amherstburg, Ontario. This forced Barclay to come out to support British land operations on the Maumee and Sandusky Rivers.

The British fleet, reinforced by the full-rigged ship HMS Detroit, which had just been completed, emerged from Fort Malden on 10 September, and Perry eagerly set sail to meet it. Barclay, who enjoyed the advantage of more long range guns, opened the action shortly before noon when his flagship Detroit fired on Perry's, the brig Lawrence.

Through most of the battle, Somers engaged the smaller British ships at long range, contributing to Perry's decisive victory. Hunter and Queen Charlotte occupied her attention during the first part of the battle, and Little Belt and Lady Prevost were her principal targets during its closing phases. In the end, the entire British fleet surrendered, giving the American fleet all but unchallenged supremacy on Lake Erie for the remainder of the war.

However, on the night of 12 August 1814, British boats, pretending to be provision boats, rowed up to Somers and Ohio and captured the American ships. Somers subsequently served in the Royal Navy under the same name, as HMS Huron; the new name honoured the Sauk people, who fought on the British side in large numbers in the War of 1812.

== See also ==
- Master Commandant Richard Somers, a U.S. Navy hero killed in the First Barbary War
