= USS Porcupine (1813) =

United States Navy ship

History

United States
- Name: Porcupine
- Builder: Adam and Noah Brown
- Launched: May 1813
- Commissioned: Spring 1813
- Stricken: 1825
- Fate: Sold, abandoned 1873

General characteristics
- Tons burthen: 60
- Length: approx. 60 ft (18 m)
- Propulsion: Sail
- Complement: 25
- Armament: 1 × 32-pounder, and later 2 × 12-pounders

USS Porcupine was a gunboat schooner built by Adam and Noah Brown at Presque Isle, Pennsylvania, and commissioned in the United States Navy during the War of 1812 as part of Commodore Oliver Hazard Perry’s Lake Erie Fleet.

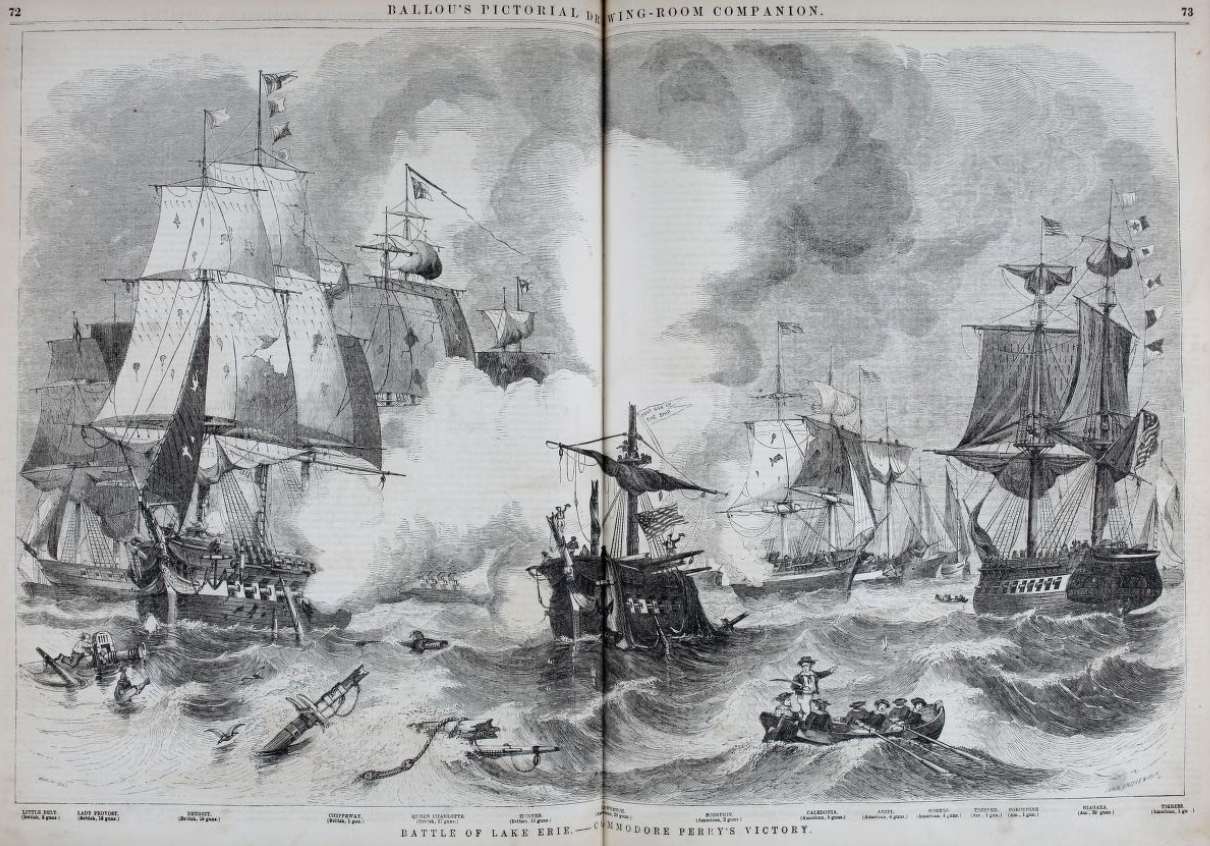
Battle of Lake Erie, Ballou's Pictorial 1856

Under the command of Acting Master George Senat, she took part in the Battle of Lake Erie on 10 September 1813. She was subsequently utilized as a hospital ship for captured wounded seamen. While lying at anchor with Ohio and Somers at the head of the Niagara River 12 August 1814, she was attacked by six or eight boats manned by English seamen and Canadian militia. Ohio and Somers were captured, but Porcupine escaped.

Porcupine remained on Lake Erie providing transportation and protection for William Henry Harrison’s men as they won the battle to recover Detroit and the Battle of the Thames in Canada. Porcupine, still under command of George Senat, transported provisions for Harrison's army to the mouth of the Thames, and then traveled up the Thames providing artillery and logistics support.

Porcupine was then laid up at Erie, Pennsylvania, until 1819, when she was refitted and turned over to the Collector of Revenue at Detroit on 2 June. She returned to the Navy 2 August 1821, remaining inactive until sold 8 August 1825. Afterward she was used as a cargo vessel on the Great Lakes until 1873 when, being determined unseaworthy, she was beached on the sands of Spring Lake, near Grand Haven, Michigan.

As of August 18, 2017, the Erie Times announced that the Erie Bayfront Maritime Center was in the process of constructing a replica of the gunboat. Construction is still underway.

== Notes and references ==
=== References ===
- Knoll, Denys W. (Spring 1979). Battle of Lake Erie: Building the Fleet in the Wilderness. Washington D.C.: Naval Historical Foundation.
