= USS Scorpion (1813) =

Schooner of the United States Navy during the War of 1812

History

United States
- Name: USS Scorpion
- Launched: 1813
- Fate: Captured by the British, 6 September 1814

United Kingdom
- Name: HMS Confiance
- Acquired: captured from US, 6 September 1814
- Fate: Broken up in 1831

General characteristics
- Type: Schooner
- Displacement: 86 long tons (87 t)
- Length: 62 ft (19 m)
- Beam: 17 ft (5.2 m)
- Draft: 5 ft (1.5 m)
- Propulsion: Sail
- Complement: 35 officers and enlisted
- Armament: 1 × 32-pounder long gun; 1 × 32-pounder carronade

USS Scorpion was a schooner of the United States Navy during the War of 1812. She was the second USN ship to be named for the scorpion. The British captured her on 6 September 1814 and took her into service as HMS Confiance. She was placed in Ordinary in 1817 and broken up in 1831.

== Career ==
Scorpion was launched in the spring of 1813 at Presque Isle (now Erie, Pennsylvania), probably by Noah Brown of New York, for service on the upper Great Lakes during the War of 1812.

Scorpion, commanded by Sailing Master Stephen Champlin, first cousin to Oliver Hazard Perry, operated with Commodore Perry's squadron on Lake Erie during the summer and fall of 1813.

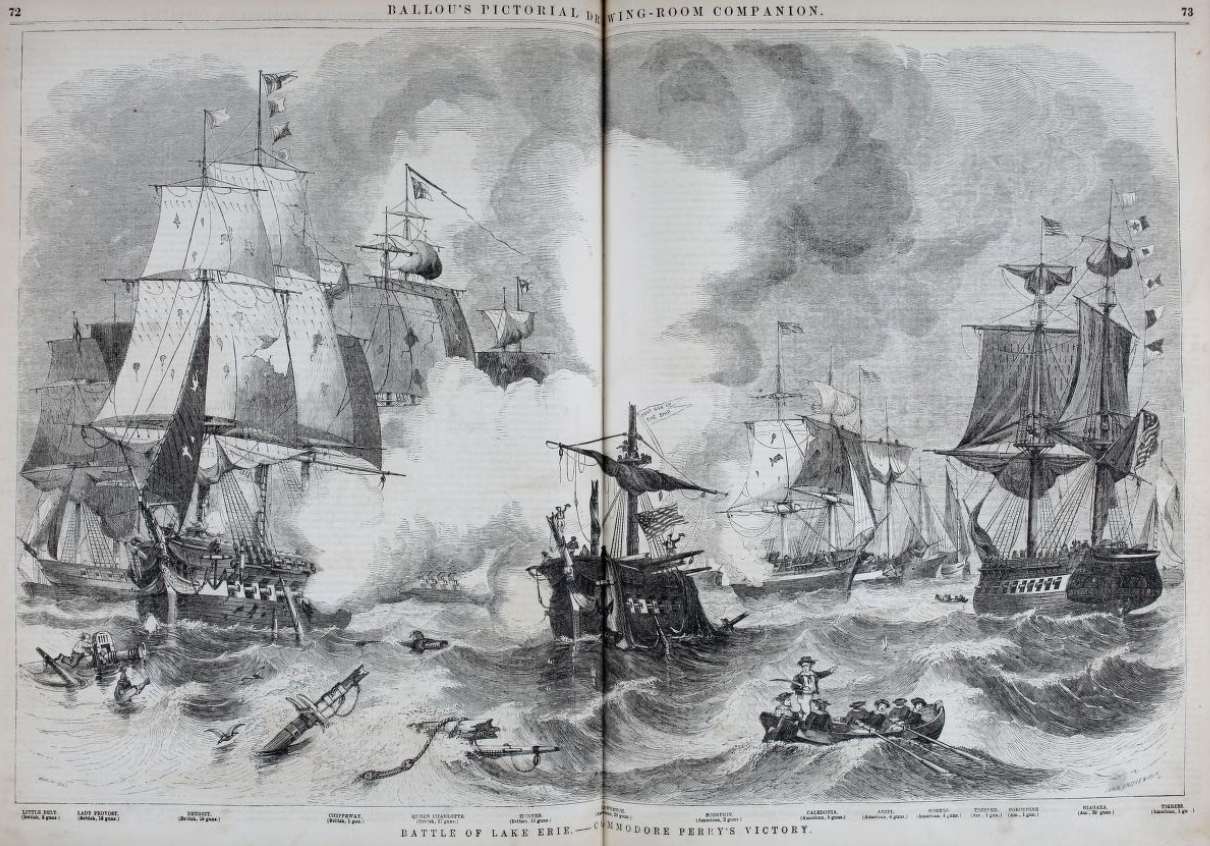
Battle of Lake Erie, Ballou's Pictorial 1856

On 10 September 1813, she participated in the battle off Put-in-Bay, Lake Erie, which resulted in the defeat and capture of a British squadron (see Battle of Lake Erie). Scorpion had the distinction of firing the first and last shot in the battle in which she lost two men. At the close of the action, she and Trippe pursued and captured the fleeing British schooners Chippeway and Little Belt.

After Perry's victory, Scorpion assisted General William Henry Harrison's forces operating in the Thames River area, by transporting troops as well as stores and ammunition captured from the enemy.

During the winter of 1813 and 1814, she was laid up at Erie, Pennsylvania. From May 1814 to September 1814, Scorpion cruised on Lake Erie and Lake Huron, cooperating with the army in the Detroit area by transporting troops, staking out the flats through the St. Clair River, and blockading the enemy at the Nottawasaga River and Lake Simcoe.

== Capture and fate ==
On 6 September 1814, while on blockade duty on Lake Huron, Scorpion, under command of Daniel Turner, was surprised and captured by the former American schooner, Tigress, which also had been taken by the British a few days earlier. Both vessels and prisoners were taken to Fort Mackinac.

Scorpion was subsequently taken into the Royal Navy as the four-gun schooner Confiance, which along with Tigress, according to local legend, was later sunk in Georgian Bay, Lake Huron, off Penetanguishene, Ontario. In fact both vessels were laid up and dismantled at Colborne Basin, Ontario.
