= Jesse Elliott =

United States Navy officer (1782–1845)

Jesse Duncan Elliott
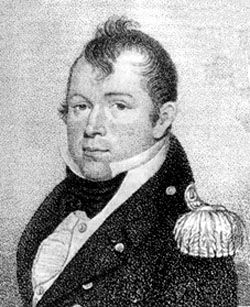
- Jesse Duncan Elliott
- Born: July 14, 1782; Hagerstown, Maryland
- Died: December 10, 1845 (aged 63); Philadelphia, Pennsylvania
- Relatives: Washington Lafayette Elliott (son)
- Military career
- Branch: United States Navy
- Service years: 1804 - 1845
- Rank: Captain, USN
- Commands: USS Niagara; USS Ontario; USS Cyane; West Indies Squadron; Boston Navy Yard; Mediterranean Squadron; Philadelphia Navy Yard
- Conflicts: First Barbary War; War of 1812; Raid at Ontario; Battle of York; Battle of Fort George; Battle of Lake Erie; Second Barbary War
- Other work: Trustee, Dickinson College 1831–1833

Jesse Duncan Elliott (14 July 1782 – 10 December 1845) was a United States naval officer and commander of American naval forces in Lake Erie during the War of 1812, especially noted for his controversial actions during the Battle of Lake Erie.

== Early life ==
Elliott was born in Hagerstown, Maryland. His childhood home, the Elliot-Bester House, was listed on the National Register of Historic Places in 1975. He enlisted in the US Navy as a midshipman in April 1804 and saw action in the Mediterranean Sea during the Barbary Wars between 1805 and 1807, serving on board the USS Essex under Commodore James Barron. In June 1807, Elliott was on board USS Chesapeake when Commodore Barron was forced to allow a search of the ship by HMS Leopard.

== War of 1812 ==
Elliott won promotion to lieutenant in April 1810 and was assigned to Lake Erie to oversee construction of the US naval squadron on Lake Erie upon the outbreak of the War of 1812. On 8 October 1812, he and Army Captain Nathan Towson captured the British brigs HMS Caledonia and HMS Detroit, formerly the United States brig Adams, anchored near the British Fort Erie in the upper reaches of the Niagara River. Caledonia escaped to an American port with a load of furs and became the USS Caledonia. Detroit was swept down the Niagara River into range of the British guns. Elliott battled the shore emplacement until his ammunition ran out and then beached the ship on Squaw Island (today known as Unity Island) and fled to the American side of the river. British and American guns destroyed the beached ship. Elliott and Towson were later commended for this action by Congress. In February 1813, however, Elliott was replaced as commander of the Lake Erie squadron by Master Commandant Oliver H. Perry.

Transferred to Lake Ontario, Elliott served under Commodore Isaac Chauncey as captain on board the flagship the USS Madison, and took part in the Battle of York on 27 April 1813 and the Battle of Fort George on 27 May. He was promoted to master commandant in July and reassigned to the Lake Erie squadron, to serve as Commodore Perry's second-in-command. He felt Perry had insufficient combat experience, and was particularly critical of Perry's choice of Presque Isle for his shipyard.

=== Battle of Lake Erie ===
During the Battle of Lake Erie against a British squadron under Captain Robert Barclay on 10 September, Elliott commanded the brig USS Niagara. Perry commanded the Niagara's sister-ship, USS Lawrence. In the center of the American line of battle, the Niagara was astern of the Caledonia which in turn was astern of the Lawrence. During the early stages of the battle, the Lawrence fought alone against several of the heaviest British ships while the Niagara was scarcely engaged. After the Lawrence was battered into a wreck, Perry took command of the Niagara while Elliott was dispatched by boat to urge the smaller American gunboats at the rear of the line of battle into closer action. The battle ended with the capture of Barclay's entire squadron.

Elliott won distinction for his actions and official praise from Perry, and was given command of the Lake Erie squadron the next month. There was nevertheless controversy over his actions during the battle. Some (including Perry) suspected that he had deliberately held Niagara out of the battle in the beginning, and they would feud over this point to the end of their lives.

=== Honors ===
On January 6, 1814, both Elliott and Perry were each honored with a Congressional Gold Medal, and the Thanks of Congress. (See 3 Stat. 141.) (Compare Congressional Gold Medal Honoring Jesse D. Elliott and Congressional Gold Medal Honoring Oliver Hazard Perry.) In addition to the medals, Elliott and Perry each received an equal share of the prize money ($7,140.00 apiece) gained from the captured British ships. In recognition of Perry's position as commodore of the squadron, Congress voted Perry an additional payment of $5,000.00, which became a source of consternation for Elliott. In 1818 Elliott was elected as an honorary member of the Maryland Society of the Cincinnati.

=== Conflict between Perry and Elliott ===
Even before the medals were presented, Elliott and Perry became embroiled in a thirty-year-long controversy over their respective conduct and fault in the battle, extending even beyond Perry's death in 1819. Perry claimed that Elliott had failed to offer timely support; Elliott decried lack of communication and signals on Perry's part. In August 1818 Perry drew up a list of charges against Elliott but was, apparently, dissuaded by the Secretary of the Navy against formally filing them.

Perry left his list of charges and specifications with his friend Commodore Stephen Decatur when he left on his diplomatic mission to Venezuela in 1819, during which he died. Elliott served as the second to Captain James Barron in the duel in which Barron killed Decatur in 1820. Decatur's widow published the charges made by Perry years later as she held Elliott to be at least partially responsible for her husband's death.

== Later career ==
Elliott commanded the sloop USS Ontario during the Second Barbary War, and was promoted to Captain in 1818, serving on a naval commission selecting sites for navy yards, lighthouses, and other coastal fortifications, until 1822. In 1820, Elliott was second to Commodore James Barron when the latter fatally shot Stephen Decatur in a duel. He was transferred to the Brazil Squadron in 1825, served as captain of the USS Cyane for two years, and later commanded the West Indies Squadron from 1829 to 1832.

Elliott was appointed commander of the Boston Navy Yard in 1833 and of the frigate USS Constitution and the Mediterranean Squadron from 3 March 1835 to 18 August 1838. During the Mediterranean assignment, he was charged with minor offenses by several of his junior officers, including using his official position for personal gain and transporting animals he had purchased aboard Constitution.

Elliott was recalled to the United States in 1838. He was politically unpopular at the time (possibly stemming back to his performance during the Battle of Lake Erie and subsequent feud with Perry), and was convicted of these charges and suspended from duty for four years until the remaining charges were dismissed by President John Tyler in October 1843. Appointed commander of the Philadelphia Navy Yard in December 1844, Elliott remained there until his death on 10 December 1845. He is buried in Mount Moriah Cemetery in Philadelphia. After being overgrown for many years, his grave was re-identified in 2012.

== Dates of rank ==
- Midshipman - 2 April 1804
- Lieutenant - 23 April 1810
- Master Commandant - 24 July 1813
- Captain - 27 March 1818
