= Adam and Noah Brown =

American shipbuilders

Adam & Noah Brown
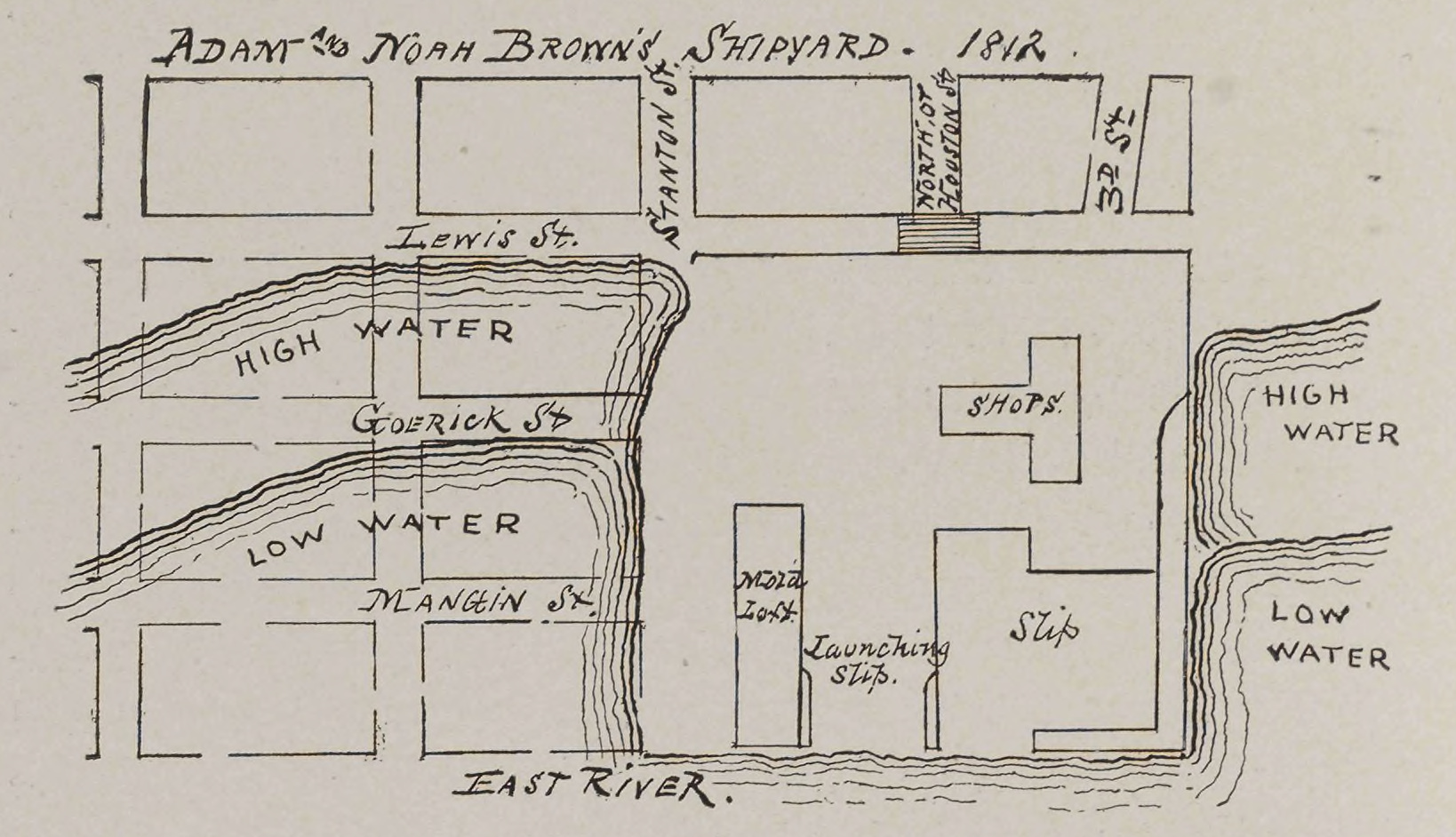
- Adam & Noah's Brown's Shipyard, 1812
- Type: Partnership
- Industry: Shipbuilding
- Founded: 1804
- Defunct: 1833
- Headquarters: New York City, United States

Adam and Noah Brown were American shipbuilders, based in New York City, founded a company with its name based in New York, which was active between 1804 and 1833. They built several notable vessels, including Robert Fulton's Demologos, the first steam-powered warship, and numerous naval vessels on Lake Erie and Lake Champlain, during the War of 1812.

== Company history ==
Adam and Noah Brown were brothers from upper New York State. Noah Brown was apprenticed as a carpenter from 1785 to 1792, and worked in New York until 1804, when he and his brother Adam built the schooner Work at Newark, Upper Canada, (now Niagara-on-the-Lake, Southern Ontario) for the North West Company. In early 1805, the brothers built a whaler at Sag Harbor on Long Island.

The Browns acquired a water lot in the East River from Stanton to 3rd Street, including "Manhattan Island," in November 1807. The island was an area of solid ground separated from the shore by salt marsh. Over the next few years the marshland was gradually reclaimed, and "Manhattan Island" eventually became part of the city. There, they built numerous sailing vessels for the merchant service.

During the War of 1812 they constructed the privateers General Armstrong, Paul Jones, Prince de Neufchatel, Warrior, Yorktown, and Zebra at New York and were then contracted to construct military vessels for the U.S. Navy. Under the general supervision of Henry Eckford, Noah Brown was placed in charge of construction on Lake Erie, and from February 1813 he completed three gunboats, a despatch schooner, and the brigs Lawrence and Niagara. Between July and September 1813 the Browns built the sloop Peacock in New York. From March 1814, they were based at Lake Champlain, where they built corvette Saratoga, nine gunboats, and converted the steamer Vicennes into the schooner Ticonderoga. From June to August 1814, at Vergennes, Vermont, they constructed the 18-gun brig Eagle. They then returned to New York to build Robert Fulton's steam battery Demologos and the torpedo-boat Mute, before working with Eckford on the construction of the ships New Orleans and Chippewa at Sacketts Harbor in early 1815. Following the end of the war Noah Brown served as assistant alderman in New York's Tenth Ward representing the Republican party.

This wartime activity proved very profitable, as in 1815 Adam and Noah Brown were assessed for personal taxes of $15,000 each. Noah Brown was also active in the development of real estate on the east side of the city.

Early on 14 March 1824, a fire broke out in the Browns' sawmill and spread rapidly to the adjoining yard of Brown & Bell, destroying two steamboats, two brigs, and a large quantity of timber. The fire also extended to the yard of Isaac Webb & Co., where a frame building and a considerable quantity of timber was burned. Fire Engine No. 33, "Black Joke", was also destroyed in the blaze and the firemen had to jump into the river to escape.

The last vessel constructed by Noah Brown was the ferryboat Sussex, built for the New York and Jersey City Ferry Company in 1833.

== List of ships ==
Ships built by Adam and Noah Brown include:

- Frances (1804)
- Swift (1805)
- Trident (1805)
- Boneta (1806)
- Maria Theresa (1807)
- Pacific (1807)
- Tonquin (1807)
- Phorion (1807)
- Mentor (1808)
- America (1809)
- Chinese (1809)
- Highlander (1810)
- Aricola (1810)
- Colt (1810)
- Ontario (1812)
- Ariel (1813)
- James Munroe (1817)
- Horatio (1818)
- China (1818)
- Ajax (1821)
- Montano (1822)
- American (1822)
- Lewis (1823)
- Sabina (1823)
- Natchez, steamboat (1823)
- Diamond (1823)
- William Byrnes (1824)
- Nassau (1824)
- Manchester (1825)
- Sussex (1833)

== Legacy and honors ==
- The World War II Liberty Ship SS Noah Brown was named in Noah's honor.

== See also ==
- Walk-in-the-water — Steamboat whose building was supervised by Noah Brown
