= USS Lawrence (1813) =

United States Navy brig

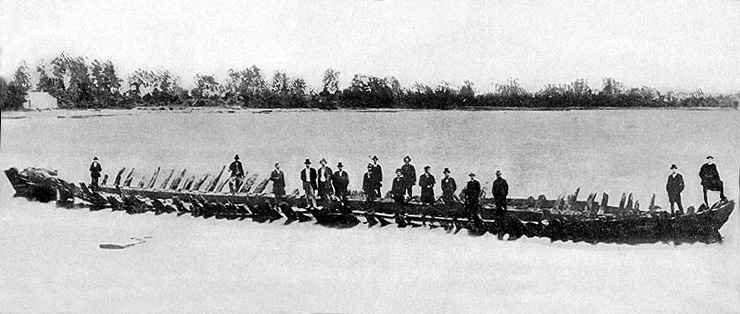
- Raised hulk of Lawrence, Misery Bay, Erie, Pennsylvania, 1875

History

United States
- Namesake: James Lawrence
- Awarded: 18 February 1813
- Builder: Adam and Noah Brown
- Launched: 24 May 1813
- Commissioned: August 1813
- Out of service: 1815
- Fate: Sunk for preservation 1815, raised 1875, lost in 1876 fire

General characteristics
- Class & type: Niagara-class brig
- Displacement: 493 tons
- Length: 109 ft 9 in (33.45 m)
- Beam: 32 ft (9.8 m)
- Draft: 4 ft 8 in (1.42 m)
- Propulsion: Sail
- Complement: 134
- Armament: 2 × long 12-pounders; 18 × short 32-pounder carronades

USS Lawrence was one of two 493-ton Niagara-class brigs (more correctly: snows) built at Erie, Pennsylvania, by Adam and Noah Brown under the supervision of Sailing Master Daniel Dobbins and Master Commandant Oliver Hazard Perry, for United States Navy service on the Great Lakes during the War of 1812.

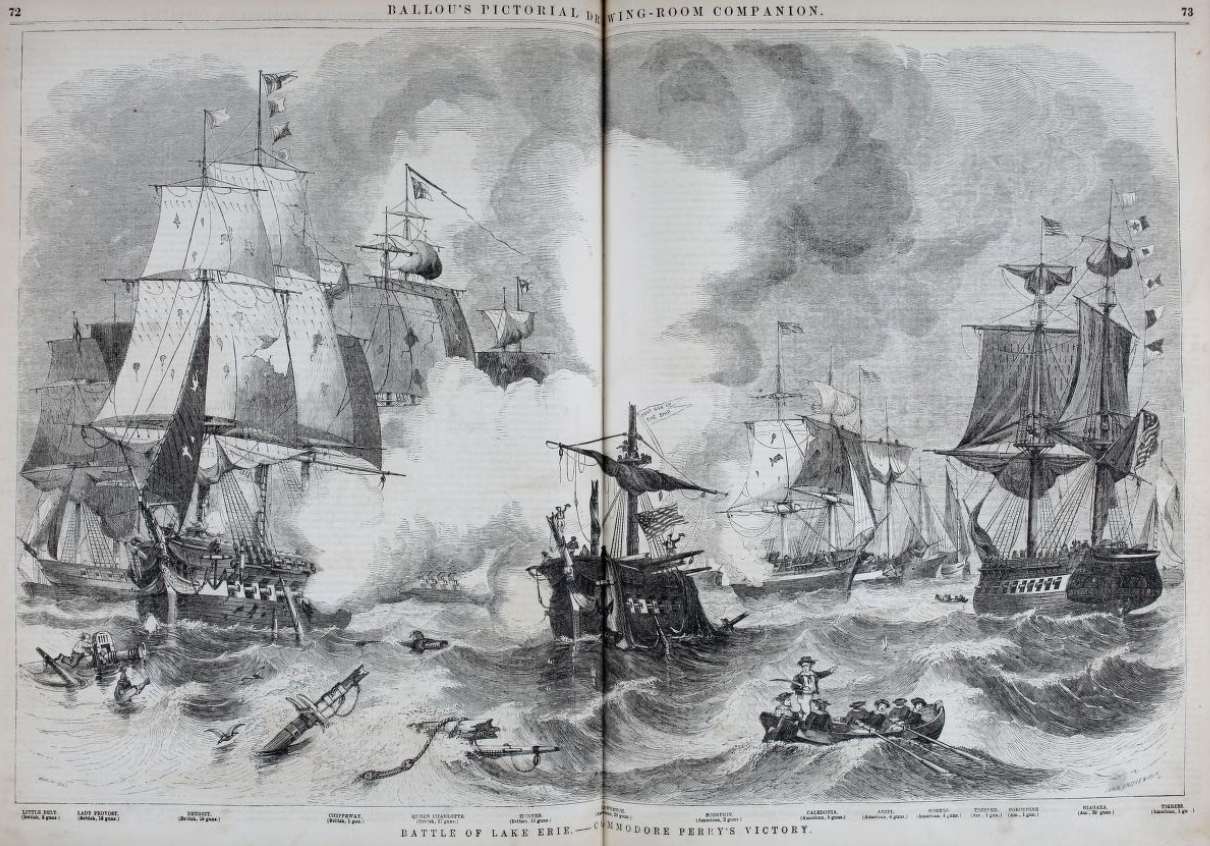
Battle of Lake Erie, Ballou's Pictorial 1856

She was commissioned in early August 1813, named in honor of Captain James Lawrence who had died June 4, 1813, in a famous battle with HMS Shannon. Lawrence quickly began operations with a voyage to Detroit, Michigan, in search of the opposing British squadron. During the 10 September 1813 Battle of Lake Erie, Lawrence served as flagship for Commodore Oliver Hazard Perry until she was disabled by British fire. Perry then transferred to her sister ship, Niagara, from which he fought the battle to a successful conclusion. The British never took physical possession of the surrendered Lawrence and so Perry automatically regained the ship at the end of the battle with no recapturing action needed. Perry received the enemy squadron's surrender on the deck of the Lawrence.

In mid-1815, following the end of hostilities, Lawrence was sunk in Misery Bay on Presque Isle, Pennsylvania, in order to preserve her hull. Her submerged hulk was sold in 1825 and, except for a brief examination in 1836, remained underwater for five more decades.

In September 1875, her remains were raised, cut into sections and transported by rail to Philadelphia, Pennsylvania, where she was exhibited during The U.S. Centennial International Exhibition of 1876. The pieces were not reassembled, instead being laid out in a way to convey the ship's dimensions and shape. It was announced in May 1876 that come the end of the exhibition her remains would be cut up and sold for canes, chairs, and the like, to relic hunters. However, in December 1876, after the exposition closed for good, the ornate pavilion at the showgrounds caught fire and the exhibit was reduced to ashes.

Lawrence County, Pennsylvania, was named for the ship.
