= Michigan Fencibles =

- Active: 1813-1815
- Country: Upper Canada
- Allegiance: British Empire
- Branch: Fencibles
- Type: Line infantry
- Size: Company
- Garrison/HQ: Fort Mackinac
- Engagements: War of 1812: Battle of Prairie du Chien; Battle of Mackinac Island (1814); Battle of Credit Island

Commanders
- Notable commanders: William McKay

The Michigan Fencibles were a small British/Canadian fencible company of line infantry raised during the War of 1812. Recruited chiefly at Michilimackinac (Mackinac Island) in 1813, the corps served in the upper Mississippi Valley, most notably in the capture and occupation of Prairie du Chien and the defence of Mackinac Island, before being disbanded after the war.

== Formation ==
The Michigan Fencibles were raised at Fort Mackinac in the summer of 1813. The brainchild of the fort's commander, Captain Charles Roberts (who had led the initial assault which captured the fort from the US in back July 1812), Roberts recruited the fencibles to bolster his limited garrison; primarily from trappers, voyageurs, French Canadians, and Métis men familiar with the Great Lakes and upper Mississippi country. Contemporary accounts give an initial strength of one lieutenant and about 50 rank-and-file soldiers, although later summaries describe the corps as numbering about 45 men. Like other fencible formations, the Michigan Fencibles were raised for service in North America rather than overseas. The term fencible derives from “defencible” and referred to troops organized for local or regional defence during wartime.

== History ==
In March 1814, command of the Michigan Fencibles was given to Captain William McKay, formerly of the 5th Battalion, Select Embodied Militia. According to the commander at Fort Mackinac, Lieutenant-Colonel Robert McDouall of the Glengarry Light Infantry; the appointment was a wise decision since McKay (a retired fur trader and partner in the North West Company) was “very popular with [the Fencibles] & all the Canadians.” Later that April, McKay was made a brevet Major.

=== Prairie du Chien ===
That late-June, McDouall received news of the capture of Prairie du Chien by the Americans and the construction of a fort (named Fort Shelby in honor of Kentucky Governor Isaac Shelby) on a large mound north of the main village. The occupation of such a strategic post threatened British military control and Canadian fur-trade interests in the northwest. In response, McDouall dispatched an expedition consisting of a detachment of the Michigan Fencibles, Voyageur militia, a small Artillery detachment with a brass 3-pounder gun commanded by Sergeant James Keating of the Royal Artillery, and about 136 native allies; placed under the command of McKay (now with the local rank of lieutenant-colonel) to retake Prairie du Chien. The Fencibles subsequently moved by way of Green Bay toward Prairie du Chien, then an important fur-trade settlement near the confluence of the Wisconsin and Mississippi rivers, in present-day Wisconsin.

While en route, McKay's force was reinforced at Green Bay by local militia, the newly raised Mississippi Volunteers (recruited from local French-Canadian and Métis residents); more voyageurs and natives. By the time they arrived at Prairie du Chien, McKay's force had swelled to aprox. 650 men. After 2 days besieging Fort Shelby, McKay ordered heated shot prepared for the cannon in order to set fire to the fort. The fort's commander, Lieutenant Joseph Perkins of the 24th US Infantry, upon realizing the situation his men were now in (with dwindling supplies, ammunition and most importantly water); offered to surrender to McKay on 19 July. McKay accepted, with the official surrender taking place the next day the following day on 20 July. Afterwards, Fort Shelby was renamed Fort McKay in his honour and was garrisoned jointly by the Michigan Fencibles and the Mississippi Volunteers.

=== Mackinac Island ===
Around the same time, an American force attempted to recapture Fort Mackinac (which had first been captured from them at the start of the war in July 1812). The Michigan Fencibles as part of the garrison along with the Royal Newfoundland Fencibles; would ultimately succeed in repulsing the American attempt. The British/Canadian forces would continue to hold onto Fort Mackinac until after the end of the war, eventually returning it to US control following the terms of the Treaty of Ghent.

=== Fort McKay and discipline ===
In October 1814, McKay returned to Fort Mackinac; with command of Fort McKay given to Captain Andrew Bulger of the Royal Newfoundland Fencibles. Conditions at Fort McKay were difficult. The garrison was remote, short of food and equipment, and under continual concern about an American counterattack. Records from the post describe repeated disciplinary problems among some members of the Michigan Fencibles, including absence without leave (AWOL), refusal of duty, drunkenness, and fighting. The most serious incident occurred on 31 December 1814, when a confrontation during drill escalated into what fort commandant Captain Bulger described as a mutiny. Private Antoine Bonnain resisted arrest after an altercation with the sergeant major; other soldiers refused orders to detain him, and the men withdrew to the barracks. Bulger declared martial law, convened a drumhead court martial, and ordered corporal punishment for Bonnain and for two other soldiers convicted of conduct tending to excite mutiny.

Historian Peter Monahan attributes the unrest to a combination of harsh conditions, poor provisioning, cultural tensions between the command and locally recruited soldiers, and Bulger’s strict approach to discipline. Despite the episode, the garrison held Fort McKay through the winter and withdrew in an orderly manner to Michilimackinac in the spring of 1815.

== Disbandment and legacy ==
The Michigan Fencibles were disbanded on 24 July 1815, following the end of the War of 1812 and cession of Fort Mackinac to the Americans. After the war, former commander William McKay petitioned the government of Upper Canada on behalf of former members, seeking recognition and compensation for their service; some veterans later received small land grants near Penetanguishene Bay.

== Uniform ==
The Michigan Fencibles supposedly had a uniform of red coats with black facings, but given the distance from regular supply sources and the hard conditions in which it served, it is unlikely that they ever presented a uniform appearance.

== Notable Members ==
- Lieutenant Joseph Bailly

== See also ==
- Canadian units of the War of 1812
