= Miller Worsley =

Royal Navy officer

- Born: 8 July 1791; Gatcombe, Isle of Wight, England
- Died: 2 May 1835 (aged 43); Gatcombe, Isle of Wight, England
- Military career
- Allegiance: United Kingdom
- Branch: Royal Navy
- Rank: Commander
- Commands: Royal Navy Establishment on Lake Huron
- Conflicts: Napoleonic Wars; War of 1812

Miller Worsley (8 July 1791 – 2 May 1835) was an officer in the Royal Navy, best known for playing a major part in the Engagements on Lake Huron in the Anglo-American War of 1812.

== Early career ==
Worsley was the son of a clergyman, and first joined the Navy as a volunteer in 1803. He became a Midshipman in 1805. He was present at the Battle of Trafalgar, aboard HMS Swiftsure. Although he passed the examination for Lieutenant in 1810, owing to the large numbers of officers in the Royal Navy at the time he was still a midshipman when drafted from Bermuda in 1812 with several other officers (including Acting Commanders Robert Heriot Barclay and Daniel Pring) to serve in Canada. He was finally promoted Lieutenant on 12 July 1813. Early in 1814 he was appointed First Lieutenant of the frigate HMS Princess Charlotte on Lake Ontario and participated in the Raid on Fort Oswego.

He was then appointed to command the Royal Naval detachment on Lake Huron, succeeding Lieutenant Newdigate Poyntz, who had quarrelled with the Army Commander, Lieutenant Colonel Robert McDouall, over the degree to which the Naval personnel should be subject to McDouall's orders.

== Engagements on Lake Huron ==
Worsley made his way overland to the base at Nottawasaga Bay in July and took command of the only naval vessel on the lake, the commandeered schooner Nancy. Before he could sail to Fort Mackinac with urgently needed rations and powder, he was warned that an American force was lying in wait. He attempted to conceal Nancy by towing it some distance up the Nottawasaga River and constructed a blockhouse to defend the schooner. His detachment consisted of a Midshipman and twenty-one sailors of the Royal Navy, nine French Canadian voyageurs and twenty-three Ojibwa Natives.

The Americans discovered the schooner's hiding place, and the Americans landed a superior force of infantry supported by artillery and ships firing "blind" over intervening sandy ridges. After a stiff resistance, Worlsey decided that the day was lost and made preparations to retreat. Either he or American shells set the schooner on fire. Both the schooner and blockhouse were destroyed. Worsley withdrew his small party unmolested, having lost one man killed and one wounded.

After the Americans withdrew, he then loaded two batteaux and a canoe with some supplies which the Americans had missed and set out for Fort Mackinac. After rowing and paddling 360 miles (580 km), during which passage he and his party ate only some game they shot and some fish from the lake, he spotted two American gunboats near St. Joseph Island. He concealed the batteaux and continued to Mackinac in the canoe, at one point passing only a few yards from one of the gunboats.

At Mackinac, he obtained four large boats and reinforcements of marines from Lieutenant Colonel McDouall. In the early hours of 3 September, he led a successful boarding attack on the gunboat USS Tigress, which was captured after a sharp fight. Three days later, the unsuspecting USS Scorpion also fell into Worsley's hands. This secured British supremacy on Lake Huron for the remainder of the war.

== Later career ==
Worsley fell ill in October with "Lake Fever", which affected many sailors on the Great Lakes during the war. He saw no further active service, although he was appointed half-pay commander on 13 July 1815.

After the war, he returned to his parental home on the Isle of Wight, and married in 1820. He and his wife had at least two sons and one daughter. In 1832 he became an Inspecting Commander in the Coastguard. He left in 1834 and died the next year.

Worsley Street in the City of Barrie, Ontario, is named after him. This street crosses Poyntz Street at the southeast corner of the Barrie courthouse.
