= Engagements on Lake Huron =

Aspect of the War of 1812

- Part of the War of 1812
Date	13 August – 6 September 1814
Location	Lake Huron, British Canada
Result	British-Indigenous victory

Belligerents
United Kingdom; Ojibwa	United States

Commanders and leaders
Miller Worsley; Andrew Bulger	Arthur Sinclair; George Croghan; Daniel Turner

Casualties and losses
3 killed, 9 wounded, 1 schooner destroyed 3 guns captured	6 killed, 6 wounded, 2 gunboats captured

The series of Engagements on Lake Huron left the British in control of the lake and their Native American allies in control of the northwestern sector of the Old Northwest for the latter stages of the War of 1812 including Mackinac Island.

An American force which had failed to recapture the vital outpost at Fort Mackinac in August 1814 attempted to starve its garrison into surrender by destroying the schooner Nancy which carried supplies to Mackinac from the Nottawasaga River and then blockading the island with two gunboats. A party of sailors of the Royal Navy and soldiers from the garrison of Mackinac captured both gunboats by surprise in the first week of September, leaving the British in control of the lake until the end of the war.

== Background ==
The Old Northwest, as the modern American Midwest was known at the time, was inhabited by various Native American peoples who in the late 18th and early 19th centuries were resisting, with British support, efforts of American colonists to settle in the region. The British military outpost at St. Joseph Island was the most distant extent of British authority, and furthest from reinforcement from Lower Canada. The Montreal-based North West Company, which dominated the fur trade in the Great Lakes region, was active in supplying guns to the Native Americans in exchange for furs. Almost all the "Nor'Westers", as the locally-based Scottish and French-Canadian fur traders and employees of the North West Company were known, had Native American wives, so there were close connections between the company and the Native American peoples in the region. American influence in the area was represented by a trading post and fort (Fort Mackinac) on nearby Mackinac Island.

When the United States declared war on Britain in 1812, the North West Company put its ships and its voyageurs at the disposal of the British government. The Nor'Westers pressed the British to take Fort Mackinac and to move the British garrison on St. Joseph Island to the company's trading post at Sault Ste. Marie. Captain Charles Roberts, commanding the garrison at St. Joseph Island, hastily assembled a force of 47 soldiers from the 10th Royal Veteran Battalion, 3 artillerymen, 180 Nor'Westers who were mostly French-Canadian voyageurs and 400 Native Americans. Learning that the small American garrison (61 men) of Fort Mackinac were not aware that war had been declared, Roberts' force landed on Mackinac Island in the early hours of 17 July 1812 and forced the Americans to surrender without fighting.

The news inspired large numbers of Natives to rally to the British and to Tecumseh, the Shawnee chief who was leading a confederacy of Native American tribes resisting the Americans in the Northwest. It also affected the morale of the American army under Brigadier General William Hull, who later surrendered at the Siege of Detroit. Although the Americans were aware of the importance of regaining control of the region, the British hold on the area was secure for the remainder of 1812 and for much of 1813 as their armed vessels controlled Lake Erie and repeatedly thwarted the efforts of the American Major General William Henry Harrison to regain Detroit.

Having built their own naval flotilla on Lake Erie, on 10 September 1813 the Americans won the decisive naval Battle of Lake Erie. This allowed Harrison's army to recapture Detroit and win the Battle of Moraviantown, where Tecumseh was killed. By these victories, the Americans also cut the British supply line to Mackinac via Lake Erie and the Detroit River. It was too late in the year for the Americans to send ships and troops into Lake Huron to attack Mackinac. During the ensuing winter and spring, the British established another supply line from York to Mackinac, using a former fur trading route via the Toronto portage to Lake Simcoe and then to the Nottawasaga River. This was a shorter and easier route than the route from the Saint Lawrence River via the Ottawa River, Lake Nipissing and the French River to Lake Huron, that was still used by the Montreal-based fur traders.

== American Expedition of 1814 ==
In 1814, the Americans mounted an expedition to recover Mackinac, which was part of a larger campaign to retake American territory granted by the Treaty of Paris and affirmed by the Jay Treaty. The American force initially consisted of five vessels (the brigs Lawrence, Niagara and Caledonia, and the gunboats Scorpion and Tigress), commanded by Commodore Arthur Sinclair. 700 soldiers (half of them regulars from the 17th, 19th and 24th U.S. Infantry, the other half volunteers from the Ohio Militia) under Lieutenant Colonel George Croghan were embarked.

The expedition sailed from Detroit and entered Lake Huron on 12 July. They first searched Matchedash Bay for the British supply base but, hampered by foggy weather and lacking pilots familiar with Georgian Bay, failed to find any British establishment. They then attacked the British post at St. Joseph Island on 20 July but found that it had been abandoned. On 4 August, they attacked the main British position at Fort Mackinac but were repulsed with heavy losses at the Battle of Mackinac Island.

== Action at Nottawasaga ==
In spite of their victory, the British at Mackinac were very short of provisions and would starve if they were not resupplied before Lake Huron froze at the start of winter. Sinclair had earlier captured a small schooner (Mink) belonging to the Canadian North West Company, and learned from one of the prisoners that the British supply base was at Nottawasaga Bay. Having sent Lawrence and Caledonia back to Detroit with the militia, he arrived at the Nottawasaga with Niagara, Scorpion and Tigress on 13 August.

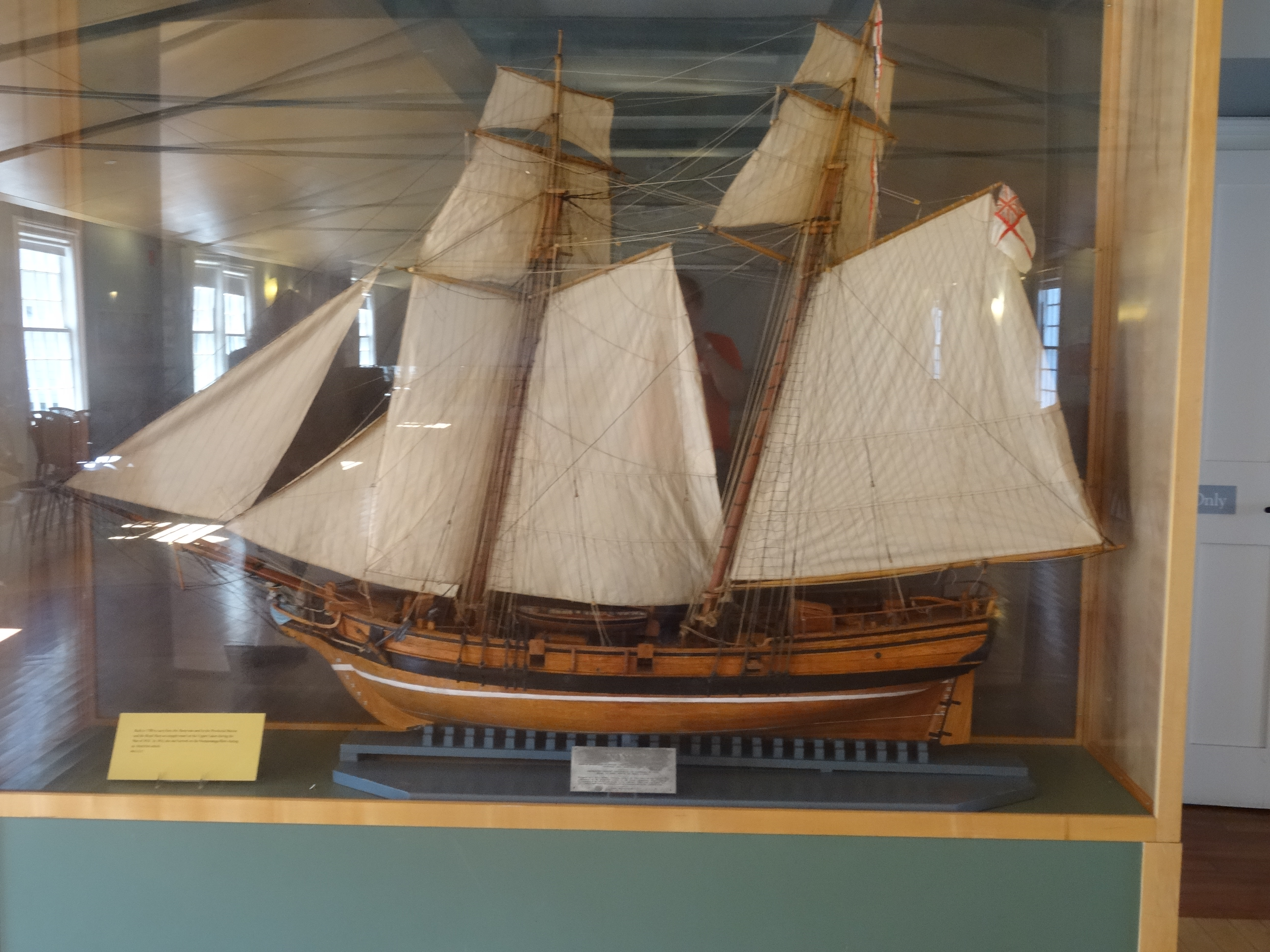
Model of HMS Nancy

The British detachment at Nottawasaga consisted of a midshipman and 21 sailors of the Royal Navy under Lieutenant Miller Worsley, and 9 French Canadian voyageurs. The schooner HMS Nancy was present at the Nottawasaga, loaded with 300 barrels of provisions (salted pork, flour, spirits etc.) for the garrison at Mackinac. A few days before the Americans appeared, Lieutenant Robert Livingston of the Indian Department had arrived, carrying a warning from Lieutenant Colonel Robert McDouall, the commandant at Mackinac, of the American presence. Nancy was towed 2 miles (3.2 km) up the Nottawasaga River, and a crude blockhouse armed with two 24-pounder carronades removed from Nancy and a 6-pounder field gun was hastily constructed for her protection. Livingston had proceeded onwards to York to request reinforcements, but none were available. (Almost all the British regular troops in Upper Canada were already engaged in the Siege of Fort Erie, and the militia could not be persuaded to turn out.) On his return, Livingston was able to gather 23 Ojibwa to help Worsley's party.

The Americans believed that Nancy was still en route to the Nottawasaga and intended to intercept the schooner on the lake, but on 14 August some of Croghan's troops landed to set up an encampment on the spit of land at the mouth of the river and foraging parties chanced on the schooner's hiding place. The next day, Croghan's troops (three companies of regular infantry) landed and attacked. The American vessels opened fire over intervening sand hills without success, but the Americans then landed a detachment of artillery with one (or two) 5.5-inch howitzers to support the infantry.

Worsley decided that further defence was impossible and made preparations to destroy the blockhouse and schooner. A line of powder was set running to Nancy and from there to the blockhouse. At four o'clock, Nancy was set alight which in turn by way of the powder train, set off an explosion in the blockhouse. The blockhouse explosion surprised Sinclair, causing him to think that one of the howitzer's shots had found its mark. Worsley's party then retreated into the woods, having suffered one killed and one wounded.

The Americans recovered the guns from the wrecked blockhouse and then felled trees across the river to block it. Sinclair departed for Detroit in Niagara, leaving the gunboats under Lieutenant Daniel Turner to maintain a blockade of the bay. Sinclair's orders were that the gunboats were to remain until they were driven from the Lake by bad weather in October, by which time it would be impossible for small boats to re-establish communications between the Nottawasaga and Mackinac. He did however authorize Tigress to cruise for a week or two around St. Joseph Island to intercept fur canoes. The gunboats' crews were reinforced by twenty-five men of the 17th U.S. Infantry, to serve as marines.

== Movements in late August ==
The Americans had missed one hundred barrels of provisions in a storehouse, and two batteaux and Livingston's large canoe which had been moved higher up the Nottawasaga River toward the depot at Schoonertown. Worsley removed the obstructions from the river and sailed in open boats for Fort Mackinac with his sailors and Livingston, carrying seventy barrels, late on 18 August. Accounts of subsequent events vary; some state that Worsley evaded the gunboats, which were forced back into Lake Huron by a storm (which also nearly sank Niagara) a few days later, while others state that one or both gunboats had left the Nottawasaga almost as soon as Niagara was out of sight, hoping to capture boats and canoes involved in the fur trade with their valuable cargoes, and thus leaving the Nottawasaga unguarded.

The Americans then heard that several boats manned by hired Canadian voyageurs under Captain J. M. Lamothe were attempting to reach Mackinac Island with supplies via the French River. To intercept this party, the gunboats cruised in a narrow channel about 36 miles (58 km) east of Mackinac Island, known as the Detour Passage. The voyageur party were warned and temporarily turned back up the French River. (Apparently, only three out of eleven boats ultimately reached Mackinac.)

Having rowed and paddled 360 miles (580 km), Worsley encountered the two gunboats in the Detour on 24 August but was able to turn aside without being spotted. He concealed the batteaux at a secluded bay and his whole party reached Mackinac Island in the canoe on 1 September. At one point, he had passed within only a few yards of one of the gunboats at night, without being detected.

== Capture of the gunboats ==
Supplies at Mackinac had run so short that McDouall's soldiers were on half rations, and he had even killed some horses to feed the Native Americans. Worsley asked McDouall for reinforcements to be used to attack the gunboats. He was given four large boats and 60 men of the Royal Newfoundland Fencibles, all of whom were accustomed to serving as marines. Lieutenants Bulger, Armstrong and Raderhurst of the Royal Newfoundland commanded three of the boats. Worsley commanded the other, which held 17 of his sailors. Bulger's boat was armed with a 3-pounder gun railing gun, removed earlier from Nancy and Worsley's with a 6-pounder gun, also from the Nancy. Two hundred Ojibwa from Manitoulin Island, led by Chief Assiginack, followed them in nineteen canoes in case any warriors were fighting for the Americans.

Late on 2 September, the boats and canoes landed on Drummond Island. Worsley and Livingston went scouting the next day, and spotted Tigress anchored a few miles away. That night, the British and Ojibwa set out towards the gunboat. Except for Lieutenant Robert Dickson of the Indian Department and three chiefs, the Native Americans were told to wait 3 miles (4.8 km) away. In the early hours of 4 September, Worsley's four boats approached Tigress silently. The crew of the gunboat (thirty-one sailors and soldiers under Sailing Master Stephen Champlin) spotted them too late, and their fire missed. Before they could reload, Worsley's and Armstrong's boats were alongside the starboard side of the gunboat, and Bulger's and Raderhorst's boats were to port. The Newfoundlanders and Worsley's sailors swarmed on board the gunboat and overpowered the Americans after a sharp struggle. Three Americans were killed and five wounded (including Champlin and both his junior officers). Three British were killed and seven, including Lieutenant Bulger, wounded.

Livingston set off to find Scorpion, and returned two hours later to report that the gunboat was approaching. The captured Americans were hastily sent ashore. The next day, Scorpion came into view and anchored about 2 miles (3.2 km) away, but appeared not to have heard any of the fight. At dawn on 6 September, Worsley set sail towards Scorpion in Tigress, under American colours and with most of his men below decks or concealed under their greatcoats. The unsuspecting crew of Scorpion could be seen scrubbing the deck. Worsley approached to within few yards of Scorpion and then fired a volley of muskets and Tigress' 24-pounder cannon. As the vessels came into contact, Worsley's men swarmed aboard the American vessel. The surprised Americans made little resistance. Two Americans were killed and two wounded. There were no British casualties.

Scorpion (but not Tigress) had boarding nettings rigged and might have been able to fight off a boarding attempt from small boats, but not from a vessel of equal size.

== Aftermath ==
The captured Scorpion and Tigress were renamed Confiance and Surprise. They sailed at once for the Nottawasaga. On hearing of the loss of Nancy, Lieutenant General Sir Gordon Drummond, the Lieutenant Governor of Upper Canada, had urgently dispatched batteaux and extra supplies to the Nottawasaga. Confiance and Surprise returned to Mackinac at the start of October with sufficient provisions to keep the garrison of Mackinac supplied until the end of the war.

The British planned to build a frigate and other vessels at Penetanguishene on Matchedash Bay in 1815, which would have further reinforced the British advantage in the area. The end of the war put a halt to most of this construction (although the armed schooner Tecumseth [sic] and the unarmed transport vessel Bee were built in 1816 and a naval base was opened at Penetanguishene in 1817). However, all British shipbuilding efforts on the lakes had to compete for resources against those on Lake Ontario, which were being surpassed by the Americans at Sackets Harbor. Another major problem was lack of additional land transportation for such purposes.

At the end of the war, some British officers (including McDouall) and Canadians objected to handing back Prairie du Chien and especially Mackinac under the terms of the Treaty of Ghent. However, the Americans retained the captured post at Fort Malden, near Amherstburg, until the British complied with the treaty.

== Results ==
Although small in scale, the British and Ojibwa Indian successes on Lake Huron were vital, given the remoteness and sparse population of the theatre.

Some historians maintain that the expedition to recapture Mackinac Island was not merely a failure but also a waste of resources. The troops would have been better employed in the battles on the Niagara peninsula and the crews of the vessels more use in the squadron on Lake Ontario. On the other hand, 300 extra regular soldiers and the same number of sailors would have made little difference given the scale of the battles further east; and the successful recovery of Fort Mackinac would have spared other American troops tied down in garrisons in the west by hostile Native Americans.
