= Fort Drummond =

Fort Drummond may refer to the following sites:

- Fort Drummond (Drummond Island, Michigan), in the United States
- Fort Drummond (Queenston Heights), in Ontario, Canada
- A name sometimes applied to the Drummond Battery in Port Kembla, New South Wales
