= Nancy (1789 ship) =

Schooner on the Great Lakes

Coordinates: 44.519214°N 80.019951°W

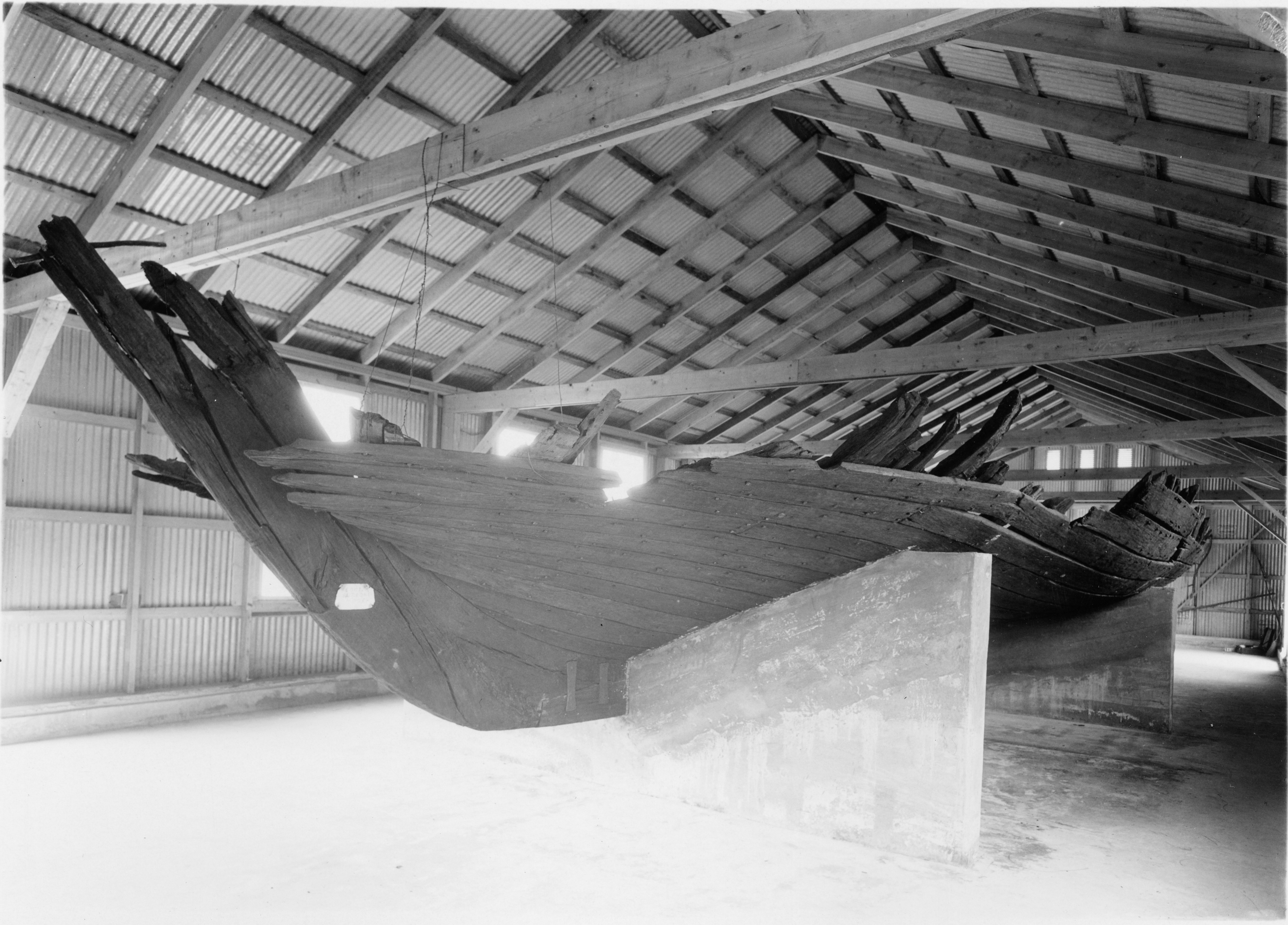
- The recovered wreck of Nancy

History

Great Britain
- Name: Nancy
- Namesake: Nancy Richardson
- Builder: Richardson Forsythe and Company
- Laid down: June 1789
- Launched: 24 November 1789 at Detroit
- Fate: Commandeered for the Provincial Marine

United Kingdom
- Name: Nancy
- Acquired: Commandeered 1812
- Fate: Transferred to Royal Navy 1814

Great Britain
- Name: HMS Nancy
- Acquired: 1814
- Fate: Burned and sank, 14 August 1814

General characteristics
- Tons burthen: 67 (bm)
- Length: 80 ft (24 m)
- Beam: 22 ft (6.7 m)
- Depth of hold: 8 ft (2.4 m)
- Propulsion: Sails
- Sail plan: two-masted schooner
- Armament: 2 × 24-pounder carronades; 2 × 6-pounder guns (1813)

Nancy was a schooner, built in Detroit, Michigan and launched in 1789. She served for several years in the fur trade on the Great Lakes, but is best known for playing a part in the Anglo-American War of 1812. She served for several years as a vital supply ship for the Provincial Marine. The Royal Navy took over the Provincial Marine in 1814 and so acquired Nancy. After HMS Nancy was blocked in by an American fleet near the mouth of the Nottawasaga River, her crew set her on fire on 14 August 1814 to prevent the capture of the ship and the cargo she carried. Forgotten for many years, the wreck was re-discovered in July 1927 and raised to form the centrepiece of the Nancy Island Museum.

== Construction ==
Nancy was built 6 miles (9.7 km) south of Detroit along the Rouge River for the fur trading company Forsyth, Richardson and Company of Montreal. (Although Detroit was by rights on American territory, it was not handed over to the United States until the Jay Treaty was signed in 1796.) At this time the company was one of the several merchant firms based in Montreal that made up the loose partnership known as the North West Company. The Indian trade on the Great Lakes was conducted by larger sailing vessels whereas birchbark canoes remained the principal means of transport in the fur trade of the Canadian north-west via the Ottawa River.

The ship was constructed out of white oak and eastern red cedar. The vessel was 58 feet (18 m) at the waterline, 65 feet (20 m) long at the deck and 80 feet (24 m) overall. The ship had a beam of 22 feet (6.7 m) and a depth of hold of 8 feet (2.4 m), capable of carrying up to 350 barrels of cargo. Nancy was 67 tons burthen with two raked masts, square topsails and fore-and-aft mainsails. A figurehead in the shape of a fashionably-dressed lady with a hat and feather was situated on the bow. The ship was armed with two 2-pounder (0.91 kg) brass cannon mounted on the deck. John Richardson, one of the partners in the company, travelled to the trading post at Detroit to begin construction, accompanied by a master carpenter and six other carpenters. Construction began in late June 1789. On 23 September 1789, Richardson wrote:

The schooner will be a perfect masterpiece of workmanship and beauty. The expense to us will be great, but there will be the satisfaction of her being strong and very durable. Her floor-timbers, keel, keel-son, stem and lower futtocks are oak. The transom, stern-post, upper futtocks, top-timbers, beams and knees are all red cedar. She will carry 350 barrels.

The schooner, named after Richardson's eldest daughter, was launched on 24 November that year. The following spring, she made her maiden voyage to Fort Erie, under the command of Captain William Mills, and in June 1790, went to Grand Portage at Sault Ste. Marie with a full cargo. For the next twenty-two years, Nancy was engaged in the fur trade. The ship changed owners several times, being sold first to George Leith and Company in 1793, and later to the North West Company in 1800. She changed commanders in 1805, when Captain Alexander MacIntosh replaced Captain Mills.

== War of 1812 ==
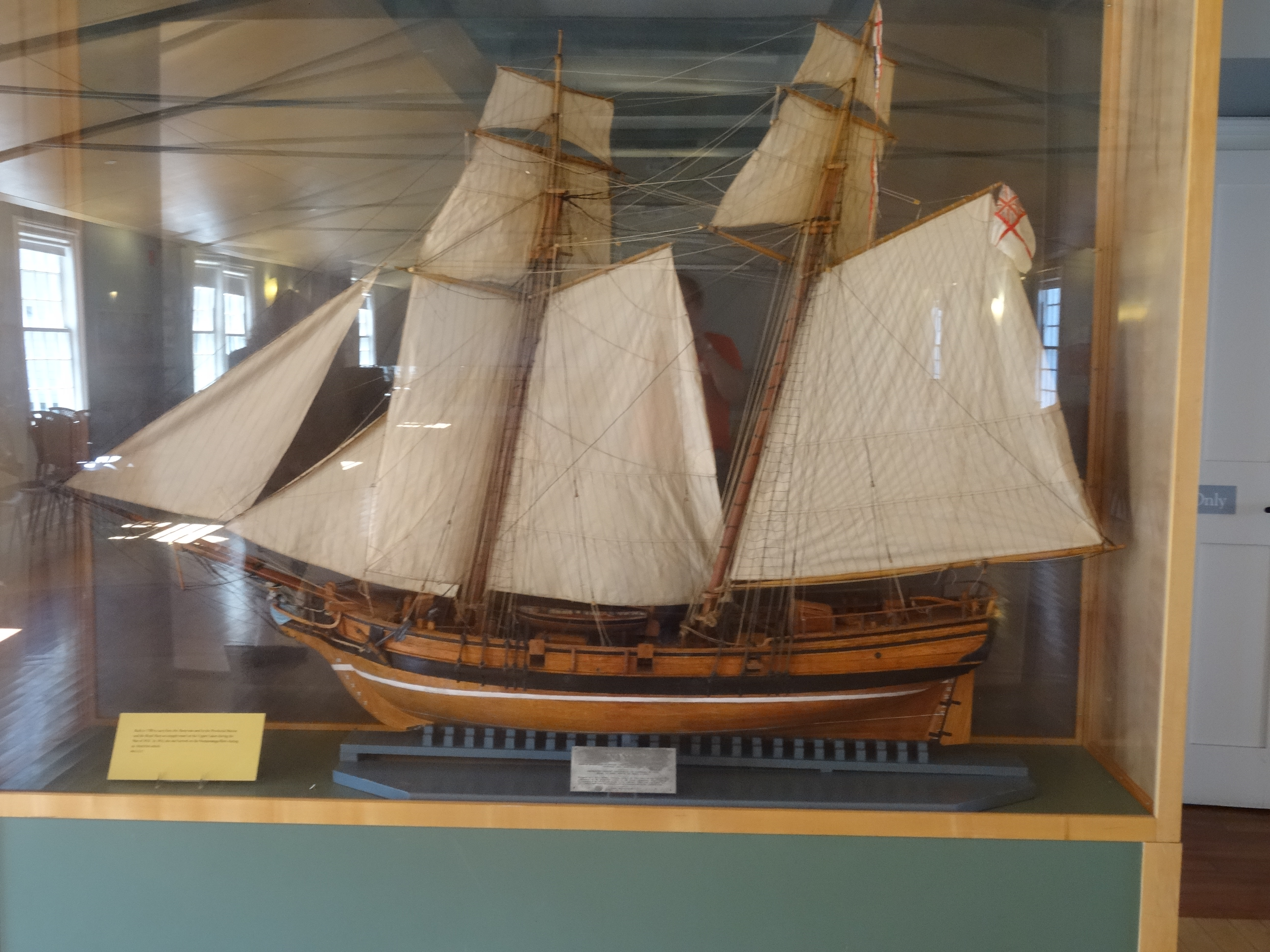
Model of Nancy

Nancy was at MacIntosh's wharf at Moy Avenue (Windsor) when the War of 1812 broke out between the United States and Great Britain. Moved for protection to Amherstburg, the ship was taken by the commander of the British garrison, Lieutenant-Colonel St George, as a transport vessel. Before the war, Lieutenant Colonel Matthew Elliott of The Indian Department had surveyed Nancy as part of an inventory of the means available in case of war. According to Elliott, Nancy could mount six 4-pounder (2 kg) carriage guns and six swivel guns. The schooner was apparently armed with some 3-pounder (1 kg) guns. Most of these were dismounted from the schooner and used to arm several small gunboats patrolling the Detroit River. At some later date, Nancy received two 6-pounder (3 kg) guns and two 24-pounder (11 kg) carronades.

On 30 July 1812, Nancy sailed to Fort Erie in convoy with the new Provincial Marine schooner Lady Prevost, returning with military supplies and 60 men of the 41st Regiment who then participated in the Siege of Detroit. After the British and members of Tecumseh's Confederacy under Major General Isaac Brock had captured Detroit, Nancy carried troops, stores and provisions between Fort Erie and Detroit during the late summer and autumn. The following spring, on 23 April 1813 Nancy joined a small squadron in moving Major General Henry Procter's division from Amherstburg to Miami Bay, positioning them for what would be an unsuccessful Siege of Fort Meigs.

On 9 September 1813, while Nancy was in Lake Huron on a trip to Fort Mackinac (which had been captured by a British force in the first few days of the war), the Americans won the decisive Battle of Lake Erie, capturing all the British armed vessels on the lake. Nancy was the only British ship remaining on the Upper Lakes. On 5 October, as Captain MacIntosh returned to the Detroit River, he sent some of the crew ashore to discover the situation. A storm blew up and MacIntosh entered the river anyway, as his anchors and cables were defective. A group of American militia on the river bank demanded that the schooner surrender. Instead, once the wind allowed, MacIntosh weighed anchor and sailed back up the river and into the lake. Although two American armed schooners and a gunboat were lying in wait for him further down the river, Nancy was damaged only by musket fire from the shore.

On Lake Huron, the schooner was further battered by storms. Her sails and cables were too badly worn or damaged to withstand any more bad weather, so she sailed to Sault Ste. Marie, where she was laid up, and refitted by her crew during the winter.

By recapturing Detroit, the Americans had cut the principal route by which the British at Fort Mackinac and other posts in the North West were supplied. During the winter, the British opened an alternate route overland from York on Lake Ontario via Yonge Street to Holland Landing and the Holland River. From here, the route entered Lake Simcoe and led to the head of Kempenfeldt Bay (Barrie) where Nine Mile Portage led to Willow Creek, the Nottawasaga River and Lake Huron. Lieutenant Colonel Robert McDouall reached Fort Mackinac via this route on 19 May 1814, to take charge of the post and the surrounding area. McDouall was accompanied by Lieutenant Newdigate Poyntz of the Royal Navy, who took charge of the naval establishment on Lake Huron, which essentially was Nancy only. (MacIntosh was retained as a pilot.) Plans to turn the schooner into a gunboat were discarded as unproductive, and the ship continued as a supply ship during that summer, making three round trips between the Nottawasaga and Mackinac.

== Destruction of Nancy ==
During one of the ship's supply trips to the Nottawasaga, in July 1814, an American force left Detroit, intending to recover Fort Mackinac. Their frontal assault was defeated in the Battle of Mackinac Island. However, they had learned of the location of Nancy from a prisoner, and three of their vessels proceeded to Nottawasaga Bay.

At the Nottawasaga, Lieutenant Miller Worsley of the Royal Navy had succeeded Poyntz and taken command of Nancy, which was about to sail to Mackinac with 300 barrels of flour, bacon and other rations. He was warned of the American presence and had Nancy towed 2 miles (3.2 km) up the river, where he hastily built a blockhouse armed with two 24-pounder carronades and a 6-pounder gun (presumably dismounted from the schooner). His force consisted of 21 sailors, 23 Ojibwa and 9 French-Canadian voyageurs.

On 13 August, Captain Arthur Sinclair led three American vessels (Niagara, Scorpion and Tigress) into Nottawasaga Bay. The Americans believed that Nancy was still out on the lake and heading back to the Nottawasaga, and intended to wait in ambush for her in the bay. However, Sinclair landed some of his embarked troops to make an encampment on the spit of land between the river and the lake shore, and some wood-cutting parties discovered the schooner's hiding place.

The next day, three companies of American regular infantry, supported by a 5.5-inch (140 mm) mortar and the guns of Sinclair's ships, attacked Worsley's position. Faced with overwhelming odds, Worsley determined to scuttle Nancy to prevent the enemy from capturing her or her valuable stores. A line of powder was set running to Nancy and from there to the blockhouse. At four o'clock, Nancy was set alight, which in turn by way of the powder train, set off an explosion in the blockhouse. The blockhouse explosion surprised Sinclair, causing him to think that one of the howitzer's shots had found its mark.

After the action, the gunboats Scorpion and Tigress were left to guard the river to prevent canoes and bateaux from getting supplies to Fort Mackinac. Eventually the river mouth was blocked with felled trees, and the two gunboats proceeded along the north shore in the hope of intercepting fur-laden canoes on the lake. Worsley and his men removed the obstructions and reached Mackinac in a large canoe on 31 August after paddling and rowing for 360 miles (580 km). Reinforced by soldiers from the garrison of Mackinac and native warriors led by Chief Assiginack (Black Bird), Worsley subsequently surprised and captured both American gunboats in the Engagement on Lake Huron.

== Aftermath ==
After the war, the Admiralty paid the North West Company £2,200 for the destruction of the ship in service, with additional compensations for services between 1812 and 1814 totaling £1,243, 5s.

== Nancy Island ==
An island grew over the remains of the ship as silt was deposited by the river around the sunken hull. The hull remained visible under water. It was discovered on 1 July 1911 by C. H. J. Snider, a noted Canadian marine historian and editor of the Toronto Telegram, but drew little notice until after 1924. In August of that year, Snider, Dr. Alfred H. Macklin, C. W. Jefferys and Dr. F. J. Conboy began a fund-raising campaign to assist with the recovery of the wreck the following year.

In the process, the recovery crew found numerous valuable artifacts including an assortment of 24-pounder and 6-pounder shot. Following further explorations by C. H. J. Snider and his salvage crew, the hull was excavated. Nancy's figurehead, ship's cutlery and numerous personal artifacts were recovered from both the bottom and the banks of the Nottawasaga River. Dr. Macklin and C. W. Jefferys persuaded the Government of Canada to provide a World War I-style metal military storage building for the museum. In 1923, the site was designated a National Historic Site by Historic Sites and Monuments Board of Canada and a cairn was erected in 1954.

In 1927, the remains of Nancy were raised and relocated onto the island. The Nancy Museum was opened on the island on 14 August 1928 to recognize the ship and its major contribution to the war effort. In 1968, the contemporary museum was opened, which includes audiovisual displays, a lighthouse and theatre. In 1978, the site was placed under the management of Wasaga Beach Provincial Park.

== In popular culture ==
The Detroit River incident of 5 October 1813 was the basis for the song "The Nancy" by Canadian singer/songwriter Stan Rogers on his From Fresh Water album.

== Sources ==
- Bamford, Don (2007). Freshwater Heritage: A History of Sail on the Great Lakes, 1670–1918. Toronto: Natural Heritage Books [Dundurn Group]. ISBN 978-1-897045-20-6.
- Baxter-Moore, Nick (Winter 2005). "Recording the War of 1812: Stan Rogers' (Un)sung Heroes". College Quarterly. 8 (1). Toronto: SenecaPress. ISSN 1195-4353.
- Collins, Gilbert (2006) [1998]. Guidebook to the Historic Sites of the War of 1812 (Second ed.). Toronto: Dundurn Press. ISBN 1-55002-626-7.
- Cruikshank, Ernest A. (1964). "An Episode of the War of 1812: the Story of the Schooner Nancy". In Zaslow, Morris (ed.). The Defended Border: Upper Canada and the War of 1812. Macmillan of Canada. OCLC 480289.
- Gough, Barry (2006). Through Water, Ice & Fire: Schooner Nancy of the War of 1812. Toronto: Dundurn Press. ISBN 1-55002-569-4.
- "Nancy Island Historic Site". The Canadian Encyclopedia (Online ed.). Historica Canada.
