= Battle of Mackinac Island (1814) =

- Part of the War of 1812
- Topographic map of Mackinac Island. Crossed swords pinpoint the location of the battle in 1814
Date	26 July – 4 August 1814
Location	Mackinac Island, Michigan 45.853056°N 84.6175°W
Result	British-Indigenous victory

Belligerents
Native Americans (United Kingdom of Great Britain and Ireland) United Kingdom	United States

Commanders and leaders
Robert McDouall; Robert Dickson	George Croghan; Andrew Holmes †; Arthur Sinclair

Units involved
Royal Newfoundland Fencibles; Michigan Fencibles	17th Infantry Regiment; 19th Infantry Regiment; 24th Infantry Regiment; Ohio Militia Battalion

Strength
300 Native Americans, 140 regulars, 25 militia (untrained)	700

Casualties and losses
1 dead, 1 wounded	13 dead, 55 wounded

Battlefield of 1814 Informational Site
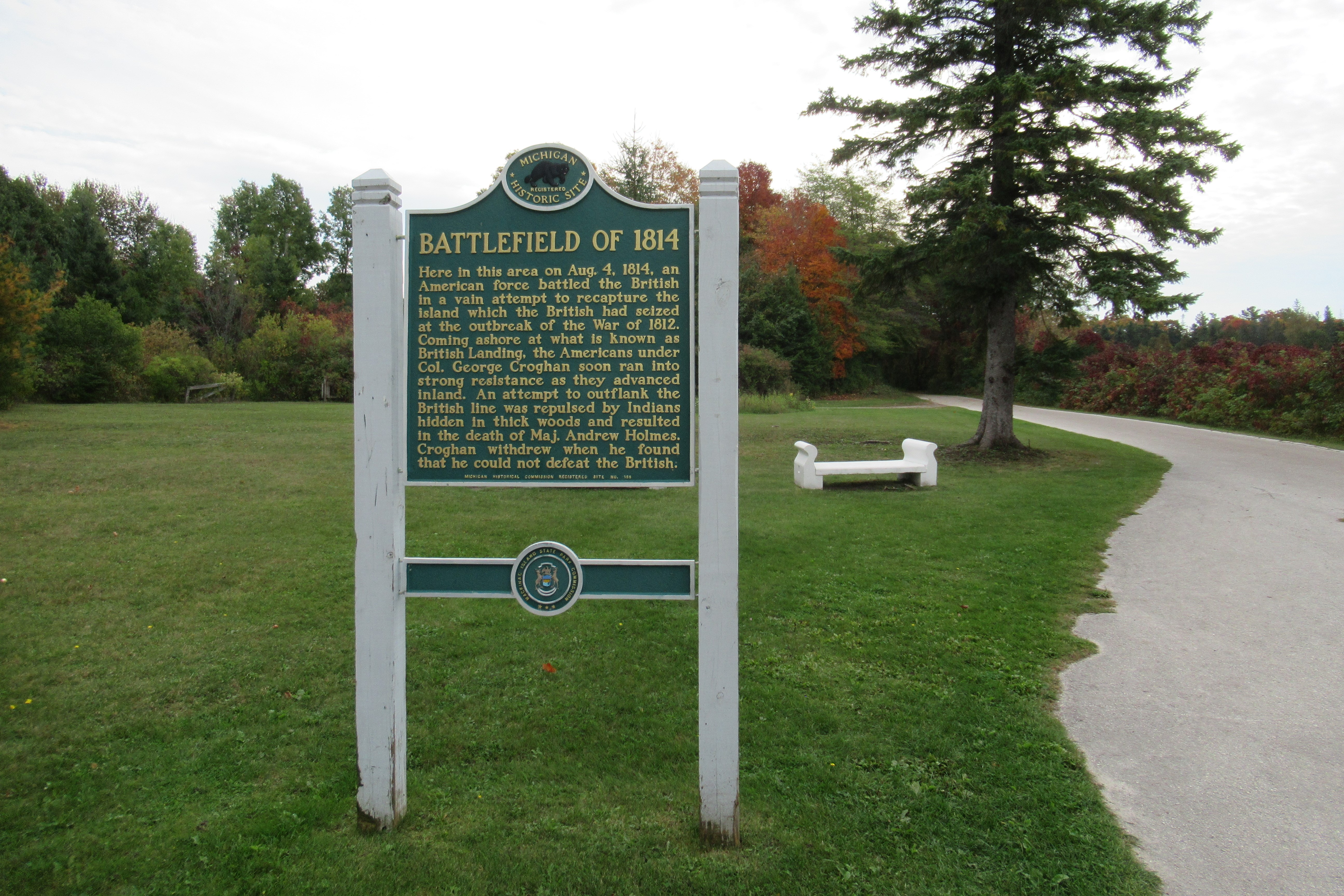
- Interactive map of Battlefield of 1814 Informational Site
- 45°52′25″N 84°38′03″W
- Location: British Landing Road; Mackinac Island, Michigan

Michigan State Historic Site
- Designated: March 19, 1958

The Battle of Mackinac Island (pronounced Mackinaw) was a British victory in the War of 1812. Before the war, Fort Mackinac had been an important American trading post in the straits between Lake Michigan and Lake Huron. It was important for its influence and control over the Native American tribes in the area, which was sometimes referred to in historical documents as "Michilimackinac".

A scratch British, Canadian and Native American force had captured the island in the opening weeks of the war. An American expedition was mounted in 1814 to recover the island. The American force advertised its presence by attempting to attack British outposts elsewhere on Lake Huron and Georgian Bay, so when they eventually landed on Mackinac Island, the garrison was prepared to meet them. As the Americans advanced on the fort from the north, they were ambushed by Native Americans, and forced to re-embark with heavy casualties.

== Background ==
Mackinac Island, and the Canadian North West Company's trading post at Sault Ste. Marie nearby were vital posts in the fur trade, which dominated the economy and way of life of the Native American nations in the area known as the Old Northwest. Most of the Native Americans were opposed to United States expansion and encroachment in the area.

On 18 July 1812, a mixed force of British regular soldiers, Canadian voyageurs and Native Americans captured Mackinac Island in the siege of Fort Mackinac before the American defenders knew that war had been declared between the United States and Britain. The news of this success influenced many more Native tribes who had previously been neutral or undecided to rally to the British cause, contributing to several more British victories over the next year. The British meanwhile abandoned their own defences at St. Joseph Island and concentrated their forces at Mackinac Island.

For the rest of the year and through much of 1813, the British hold on Mackinac was secure since they also held Detroit, which the Americans would have to recapture before attacking Mackinac. Then on 10 September 1813, the Americans won the decisive naval Battle of Lake Erie, which allowed them to recover Detroit and defeat the retreating British and Native force at the Battle of the Thames. Although it was too late in the year to allow the Americans to mount an expedition to recover Mackinac before the lakes froze in winter, they had nevertheless cut the British supply lines to the post. The British garrison, commanded by Captain Richard Bullock of the 41st Regiment of Foot, were placed on half rations and also procured some fish and maize locally but were suffering severe shortages by the end of the winter.

=== British defences ===
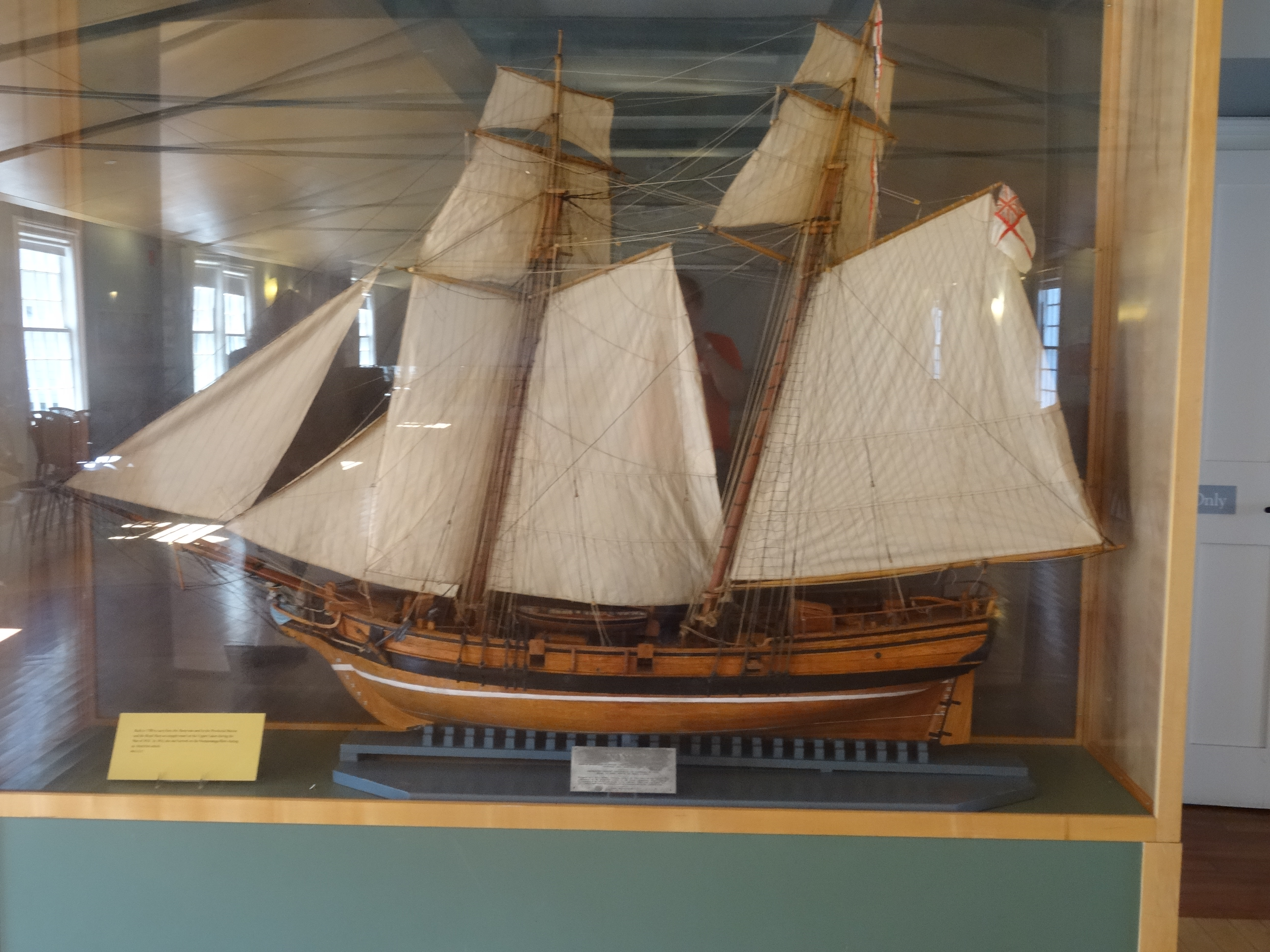
In May 1814, 21 sailors from the Royal Navy arrived to reinforce the crew of HMS Nancy, a schooner vital to resupplying Fort Mackinac.

In February 1814, Lieutenant Colonel Robert McDouall of the Glengarry Light Infantry was ordered to re-establish communications with Mackinac and take charge of the post. McDouall's first task was to open a new supply line from York via Yonge Street and Lake Simcoe to the Nottawasaga River, which flows into Georgian Bay. The Nottawasaga was selected in preference to the established post at Penetanguishene on Matchedash Bay, even though the navigation from the Nottwasaga was obstructed by rocks and shoals. However, the route from Lake Simcoe to Penetanguishene would need to be improved for 30 miles (48 km), which would be almost impossible in the depths of winter, while the overland portage to the Nottawasaga was shorter and much more easily improved.

McDouall's party consisted of ninety men of the Royal Newfoundland Fencibles, most of whom were accustomed to serving as marines, and eleven artillerymen with four field guns. He also brought with him twenty-one sailors of the Royal Navy to reinforce the crew of the schooner Nancy, which was being refitted at St. Joseph Island at the time, and thirty carpenters to assist in constructing thirty batteaux.

On 19 April, McDouall's batteaux began descending the river with the Newfoundlanders, artillerymen and sailors, and reached the Lake on 25 April. He arrived at Mackinac on 18 May, carrying a large quantity of provisions for the hungry garrison and the Native allies, having lost only one boat en route despite stormy weather. A few days later he was reinforced by another 200 Native Americans, who were under the nominal leadership of Lieutenant Robert Dickson of the Indian Department. Indigenous communities from around the region were eager to prevent the Americans from regaining a stronghold in the region, and leaders like Elizabeth Mitchell were instrumental in calling warriors to the defence of the island.

McDouall ordered the defences of the island to be strengthened. The existing fort was situated on a ridge which dominated the harbour on the south side of the island, but was itself overlooked by another wooded ridge, the highest point on the island. In 1812, the British had dragged artillery to this ridge to compel the fort to surrender. McDouall's troops built a stockade and blockhouse on the upper ridge, naming the new fortification Fort George. Plans to rebuild the Nancy as a gunboat were abandoned, and the Nancy instead made two round trips between Mackinac Island and the Nottawasaga to carry supplies.

=== American plans ===
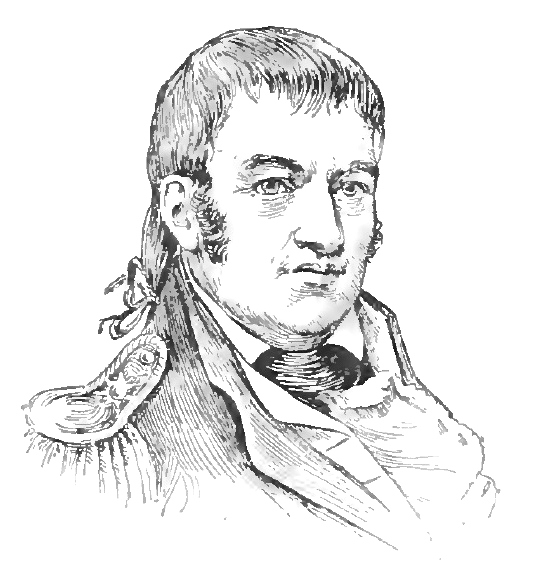
American Brig Gen Duncan McArthur established Fort Gratiot in 1814 as an advanced base to retake Mackinac Island.

In 1814, the Americans attempted to retake the island as part of a larger campaign designed to sever the fur trading alliance between the British and the Natives in the northwestern states and territories. The United States Secretary of the Navy, William Jones, supported an attack on Mackinac as this would provide employment for the vessels of the American squadron on Lake Erie, which otherwise would have little further useful part to play in the war. The expedition to recover Mackinac was prepared at Detroit, and Brigadier General Duncan McArthur established Fort Gratiot at the southern end of Lake Huron as an advanced base.

William Clark, Governor of the Missouri Territory, meanwhile led an expedition to establish a fort at Prairie du Chien on the Mississippi River. News that the Americans had occupied Prairie du Chien arrived at Mackinac on 21 June. McDouall was compelled to weaken his garrison by despatching an expedition under William McKay (who held the local rank of Lieutenant Colonel) to recover the post.

On 3 July, a squadron of five American brigs and gunboats under Commodore Arthur Sinclair sailed from Detroit, carrying an embarked landing force of 700 soldiers under the command of Lieutenant Colonel George Croghan. The force consisted of an ad hoc battalion of regular infantry (made up of five detached companies of the 17th, 19th and 24th U.S. Infantry) under Major Andrew Holmes and a battalion of volunteers from the Ohio militia under Colonel William Cotgreave, with detachments of artillery.

Rather than make directly for Mackinac, the American squadron first searched Matchedash Bay for the base from which the British at Mackinac were supplied, which the Americans thought was at Penetanguishene. As the weather was foggy and the Americans had no pilots familiar with the area, which abounded with islets and sunken rocks, they spent a week in the bay but found nothing. They then sailed to St. Joseph Island, which had been the original British military post in 1812, but found it had been abandoned. They burned the empty post, and also the Canadian North West Company trading post at Sault Sainte Marie.

The Americans finally arrived off Mackinac on 26 July. Their delayed arrival had given McDouall ample warning, and he had further reinforced his defences by calling in the last two companies of militia left to defend St. Joseph Island and Sault Ste. Marie.

== Battle ==
After two days of naval bombardment, Lt Col George Croghan decided to land his force on the north side of the island, and work his way through the woods to attack the British positions.

The American ships attempted to bombard the fort for two days, with most of the shot falling harmlessly in vegetable gardens around the fort. Sinclair discovered that the new British blockhouse, Fort George, stood too high for the naval guns to reach. A dense fog then forced the American squadron away from the island for a week. When they returned, Croghan decided on 4 August to land on the north side of the island roughly where the British had landed in 1812 (the present-day community of British Landing) and work his way through the woods to attack the blockhouse. The American brigs and gunboats bombarded the woods around the landing site to flush out any Natives, further sacrificing any chance of gaining surprise.

Rather than wait to be attacked, McDouall left only 25 militiamen in Fort Mackinac and another 25 in the blockhouse and advanced with the main body of his force to occupy low breastworks which faced a clearing which lay on the Americans' line of advance. His force consisted of 140 men of the Royal Newfoundland and the locally raised Michigan Fencibles, 150 Menominee from the Wisconsin River, who McDouall considered to be the best fighters at his disposal, and one 6-pounder and one 3-pounder field guns.

When the Americans emerged from the woods into the clearing, they were easy targets for the British guns. Croghan brought up two 6-pounder guns, but meanwhile he sent his Ohio Volunteers, leading the advance, to outflank the British left, and sent the detachment of regulars through the woods around the British right. These manoeuvres proceeded very slowly, because of the difficult terrain. While they were in progress, a false report of another American landing west of the fort caused McDouall to withdraw the Newfoundland and Michigan Fencibles, but the American regulars were ambushed by the Natives. Thirteen Americans were killed, including Major Holmes, Captain Isaac Van Horne and another officer, fifty-one were wounded (including Captain Benjamin Desha, second in command of the regulars) and the Americans were thrown into confusion. McDouall meanwhile discovered that there was no landing behind him, and moved his redcoated infantry back into their positions.

The heavy losses and confusion among the United States regulars, and the return of McDouall's infantry, forced Croghan to order his men to retreat through the woods to the beach. Two wounded Americans were left to be taken prisoner. The Americans rowed back to their ships, leaving the fort in the British hands until the end of the war.

== Aftermath ==
The American expedition subsequently located the post at the Nottawasaga River and on 15 August, they captured it before returning to Detroit. The British scuttled the schooner Nancy, which had taken refuge in the Nottawasaga River, so that it would not fall into American hands. Commodore Sinclair left the gunboats USS Tigress and USS Scorpion to blockade Mackinac, hoping to starve the garrison into surrender before the following spring. In the Engagement on Lake Huron, both vessels fell into British hands, securing the British hold on the entire region.

== Legacy ==
Five active regular battalions of the United States Army (1-3 Inf, 2-3 Inf, 4-3 Inf, 2-7 Inf and 3-7 Inf) perpetuate the lineages of the former 17th, 19th and 24th United States Infantry Regiments, elements of which participated in the battle.

Within the Canadian Army, the history and heritage of the Royal Newfoundland Fencibles is carried on by the Royal Newfoundland Regiment (RNR). Among three Battle Honours awarded to the RNR for the War of 1812, it carries the Theatre Honour, Defence of Canada 1812-1815, for services rendered by the Regiment in engagements throughout the War, including the Battle of Mackinac Island.

Most of the site of the Battle of Mackinac Island is now the Wawashkamo Golf Links, laid out in 1898.
