= Andrew Bulger =

Andrew H. Bulger
- Born: 1789; St John's, Newfoundland
- Died: 1858 (aged 68–69); Montreal
- Spouse: Alicia May Lowther
- Children: 8
- Military career
- Branch: Royal Newfoundland Fencibles
- Rank: Lieutenant
- Unit: Royal Newfoundlanders
- Conflicts: Battle of Detroit; Battle of Stoney Creek; Battle of Crysler's Farm; Engagement on Lake Huron
- Other work: Clerk to the office of Military Secretary

Andrew H. Bulger (1789–1858) was a soldier and colonial administrator, born at St John's in the Crown Colony of Newfoundland.

In 1804 he joined the Royal Newfoundland Fencibles as an ensign, and within two years received his commission as a lieutenant. On the outbreak of the War of 1812, a substantial detachment from the regiment was sent to Upper Canada to serve as marines on armed vessels on the Great Lakes. With this contingent, Bulger saw action at the Battle of Detroit and Battle of Stoney Creek, and on the Saint Lawrence, as well as at the Battle of Crysler's Farm.

Late in 1813, he was appointed adjutant to Lieutenant Colonel Robert McDouall, newly appointed commander of the post at Fort Mackinac. Leading a party of the Royal Newfoundlanders, he was slightly wounded in the Engagement on Lake Huron in which two American gunboats were captured, saving the British post from blockade and starvation.

He was subsequently appointed to command the post at Fort McKay, at Prairie du Chien in Wisconsin. He faced a hard winter, in which he had to contend with lack of supplies, mutinous troops, difficulties with Indian allies and a quarrel with the Indian Department representative, Robert Dickson. He nevertheless remained in charge until news arrived of the Treaty of Ghent, which ended the war.

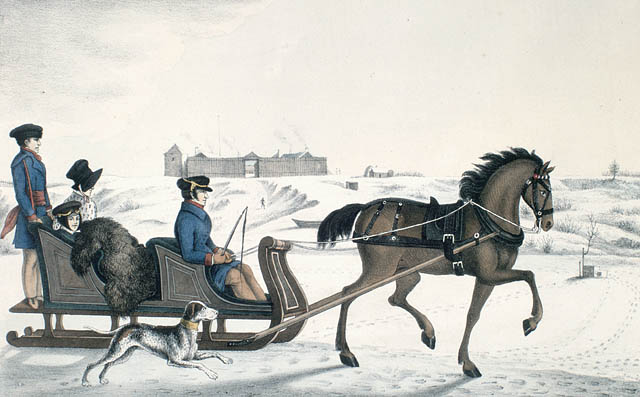
Governor of Red River, Andrew Bulger, driving his family on the frozen Red River in a horse cariole with Fort Garry in the background (1822-23)

It is notable that Bulger was the only British officer in the course of the 1812-1815 conflict who entered the war as a lieutenant, and retained that rank for the duration. Nearly 70 other officers were promoted over him during that time. At Fort McKay he was given jurisdiction with the local rank of captain, however he never received the full captaincy for which he had been recommended. Although his several post-war applications for a military appointment and remuneration for his services during the war were always fully supported by senior British officers, it was not until 1820 that he finally succeeded in obtaining a compensation of £500 and military allowance equal to the half-pay of a captain.

In 1821, on the recommendation of Gordon Drummond, temporarily Governor General of Canada, Bulger was appointed Secretary for the Red River Settlement in Rupert's Land, taking up the post in 1822. He quickly found the situation there unappealing. He quarrelled with the local representatives of the Hudson's Bay Company, who monopolised the fur trade and supplies in the colony. Eventually his stand was vindicated.

Bulger left the Red River colony in 1823, in poor health. He subsequently served for many years as clerk to the office of Military Secretary in Quebec City and later in Montreal. In 1834 at Quebec City he married Alicia May Lowther, which whom he had eight children. Bulger died at Montreal in 1858 and was buried in the old Anglican cemetery.
