= Robert Dickson (fur trader) =

Canadian fur trader (1765–1823)

- Colonel Robert Dickson
- Born: c. 1765; Dumfries, Scotland
- Died: 20 June 1823; Drummond Island
- Occupations: Frontiersman, fur trader, officer in the British Indian Department
- Employer: British Indian Department
- Spouse: Ista Towin or Totowin (Helen Elizabeth)
- Children: William Dickson

Robert Dickson (c. 1765 – 20 June 1823) was a fur trader, and later an officer in the British Indian Department in Upper Canada, who played a prominent part in the War of 1812.

== Early life ==
He was born in Dumfries, Scotland where his father was a merchant. When his father's business failed, Robert and his brothers, William and Thomas, traveled to Canada to work for their cousin Robert Hamilton. While Robert's brothers made careers for themselves in Newark and the Niagara peninsula, Robert found routine office work tedious, and was sent to Mackinac Island in 1786 to trade on his own.

He spent many years trading among the Sioux, Winnebago, and Ojibwe in modern northern Wisconsin, Iowa, Minnesota, and South Dakota. In 1797, he married Ista Towin or Totowin (Helen Elizabeth), the daughter of chief Wakinyanduta (Red Thunder) of the Cuthead band of the Yanktonai Dakota.

== War of 1812 ==
During the years preceding the War of 1812, Dickson and other British and Canadian traders were angered by American encroachments into the area where they traded, in which they had previously enjoyed a monopoly. As war appeared imminent, Dickson began recruiting warriors from among the tribes with which he traded, and gathered them at the British military outpost at Fort St. Joseph. When news of the outbreak of war arrived, Dickson and his followers joined the garrison of Fort St. Joseph, led by Captain Charles Roberts, in an attack on the American fort at Mackinac Island. They successfully captured the island from its unwary American garrison. He subsequently led his followers south to join the British army at Amherstburg, where they took part in the Siege of Detroit, which caused the surrender of an American army. In the autumn following these victories, Dickson travelled to Montreal, where he was appointed to the Indian Department as Agent and Superintendent for the Western Indian tribes.

During 1813, he led contingents of Indians at the unsuccessful Siege of Fort Meigs and Battle of Fort Stephenson. In 1814, he recruited fresh contingents of the Western Indians and led them at the successful defense of Mackinac Island and the Engagement on Lake Huron. He ended the war at the captured post of Prairie du Chien, where he quarreled with Andrew Bulger, the post's commandant.

After the war, he retired from the Indian Department although, while on a visit to Scotland in 1816, he applied unsuccessfully to be the Indian Department agent at Amherstburg.

The war had ruined Dickson's fur trading business. He nevertheless resumed trading, but died unexpectedly at Drummond Island in 1823.
