= Charles Snider =

Canadian journalist (1879–1971)

C. H. J. Snider
- Born: May 26, 1879; Sherwood, Ontario
- Died: December 12, 1971 (aged 92); Toronto, Ontario
- Occupation: Journalist
- Spouse: Mary Adelaide Dawson (m. 1908; died 1932)
- Writing career
- Period: 20th century
- Genre: History

Charles Henry Jeremiah Snider (May 26, 1879 – December 12, 1971) was a Canadian journalist, artist, and historian. He worked for the Toronto Telegram and produced a frequent column called "Schooner Days" which related stories and tales of the Great Lakes. He also published several books on the history of the Great Lakes.

== Biography ==
Snider was born in the village of Sherwood, near Maple, Ontario. His parent were Mary Lavina Rankin and Jacob Henry Snider. He was the eldest of three boys and one girl in the family. He attended Kleinburg Public School and later Jarvis Collegiate in Toronto. He studied for a year at The Auditorium of Art which later became the OCAD University. While at the art school he enjoyed sketching, painting and illustrating which helped in later in his journalism career.

During his school years, he became enthralled with activities on Lake Ontario. He first sailed in the merchant marine at age eleven. During this time he sailed on several lake schooners, including the Vienna, Loretta Rooney, Oliver Mowat, Antelope as well as the Albacore.

In 1893, replica vessels of the Nina, Pinta, and Santa Maria visited Toronto. Snider took the opportunity to make sketches of the three ships. He later sold a sketch to John Ross Robertson, a noted Toronto art collector. Robertson was owner and publisher of the Toronto Evening Telegram. Due to his connection to Robertson, Snider gained employment at the paper as a junior reporter in 1897. During his time there, he worked closely with Robertson in the publication of Landmarks of Toronto where he contributed several illustrations. Snider continued to work at the Telegram for nearly 60 years. By the time he retired in 1956 he was working as managing editor. While at the paper he wrote over 1,300 columns, entitled "Schooner Days" which described shipping on the Great Lakes as well as the men and women who lived and worked in the industry.

Due to his nautical experience, the Telegram sent Snider to cover the America's Cup in 1899. He continued to cover subsequent races for the next 38 years until 1937. Snider also travelled extensively as a correspondent for the paper reporting on many world events. Due to an injury suffered in school, he was unable to serve in World War I but did contribute as a war correspondent. He also served as a war correspondent in World War II.

In 1911, Snider found the wreck of HMS Nancy which was lost during the War of 1812 when it was burned to prevent its capture by the Americans. Snider helped to recover and restore the hulk. A replica vessel is now on display at the Nancy Island museum in Wasaga Beach.

In 1908 he married Mary Dawson. They met at the Toronto Telegram where Mary was employed as a telegraph operator. Mary was also a writer and published a column in the Telegram and was one of the founders of the Canadian Women's Press Club. Mary predeceased him in 1932.

Snider died in 1971. He is buried at Westminster Memorial Gardens, in Toronto.

== Works ==
In addition to his books, Snider wrote over 1,300 columns in the Toronto Telegram from 1931 to 1957.

- In The Wake Of The Eighteen-Twelvers, (1913)
- The Glorious "Shannon's" old Blue Duster, (1923)
- The Story of the "Nancy" and other Eighteen-Twelvers, (1926)
- Under The Red Jack, (1929)
- Leaves From the War Log of the Nancy, (1936)
- Annals of the Royal Canadian Yacht Club, 1938-1954 (1937)
- The Griffon, (1956)
- Tarry Breeks and Velvet Garters, (1958)
