= George Croghan (soldier) =

United States Army officer

- George Croghan
- Born: November 15, 1791; Louisville, Kentucky
- Died: January 8, 1849 (aged 57) New Orleans, Louisiana
- Allegiance: United States of America
- Branch: United States Army
- Service years: 1811–1817, 1825–1849
- Rank: Colonel
- Commands: Inspector General of the U. S. Army
- Conflicts: War of 1812: Battle of Tippecanoe; Battle of Fort Stephenson; Battle of Mackinac Island; Mexican–American War: Battle of Monterrey
- Spouse: Serena Eliza Livingston

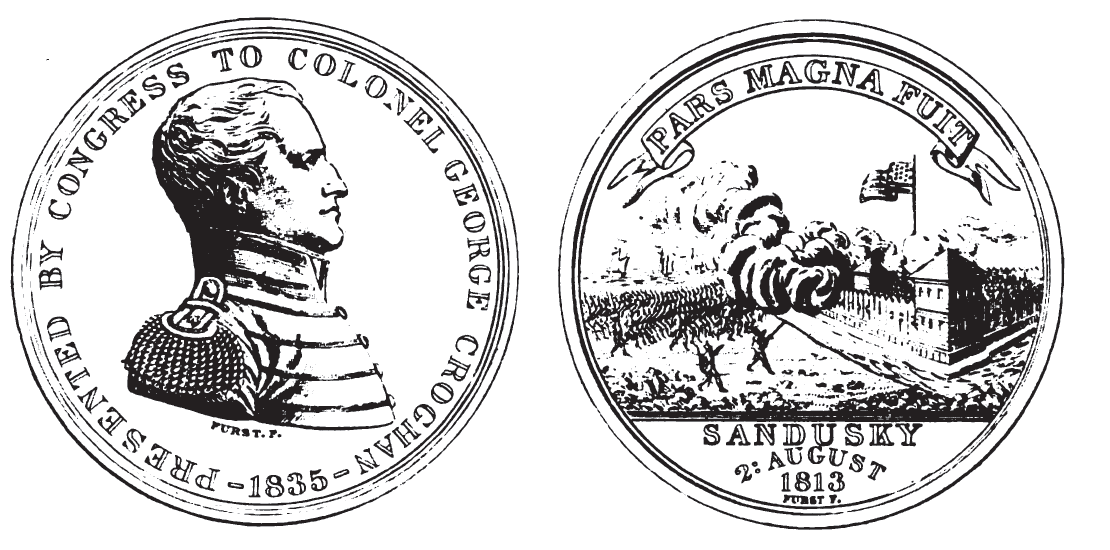
Congressional medal presented by Congress February 13, 1835. Obverse: Presented by Congress to Colonel George Croghan, 1835. Bust of Colonel Croghan Reverse: Pars Magna Fuit (His share was great.) Ft. Stephenson with three gunboats on Lake Erie in background

George Croghan (November 15, 1791 – January 8, 1849) was an American soldier who was a recipient of the Congressional Gold Medal.

== Early life ==
Croghan was born at the Locust Grove farm in what is now Louisville, Kentucky. He was a son of Lucy (née Clark) Croghan (1765–1838) and William Croghan (1752–1822), from Dublin, Ireland who he had served in the Revolutionary War at the battles of Brandywine and Monmouth. Among his maternal uncles were Capt. William Clark and Gen. George Rogers Clark.

Croghan studied at the College of William and Mary, graduating in 1810.

== Career ==
After he graduated from William and Mary, Croghan joined the U.S. Army. He fought at the Battle of Tippecanoe in 1811. He also served at Fort Meigs (modern Perrysburg, Ohio) with distinction. For his defense with a small garrison against a British attack during the Battle of Fort Stephenson, Ohio, in 1813 during the War of 1812, he was promoted to the rank of lieutenant colonel. He later led a troop that was defeated in the Battle of Mackinac Island.

Following the war, Croghan resigned from the army during a reduction in force and was appointed as a postmaster in New Orleans. In 1825, he became one of the two inspector generals in the army. During the Mexican–American War Croghan fought as a colonel at Monterrey.

== Personal life ==
Croghan married Serena Eliza Livingston (1795–1884), a daughter of John R. Livingston and Margaret (née Sheafe) Livingston. Serena was a granddaughter of Robert Livingston (1718–1775) of Clermont Manor in New York. Together, they were the parents of:

- Mary Angelica Croghan (1819–1906), who married the Rev. Christopher Billop Wyatt, a grandson of Christopher Billop, in 1848.
- St. George Louis Livingston Croghan (1823–1861), who married Cornelia Adelaide Ridgely, daughter of Commodore Charles C. Ridgely (son of Gov. Charles C. Ridgely) and Cornelia Louisiana (née Livingston) Ridgely (daughter of Robert L. Livingston and granddaughter of Walter Livingston), in 1846.
- Serena Livingston Croghan (1833–1926), who married Augustus Frederick Rodgers.

Croghan died in New Orleans, Louisiana during the cholera epidemic of 1849, which had high mortality rates. He was buried at the site of Fort Stephenson, in what is now Fremont, Ohio.

=== Legacy and honors ===
Croghan's tomb and a soldiers' memorial to the war installed by the DAR in 1903 are both located on the library grounds near Croghan Street, which was renamed in his honor.

The village and town of Croghan, New York are also named after him.
