= William McKay =

Canadian lieutenant-colonel (1772-1832)

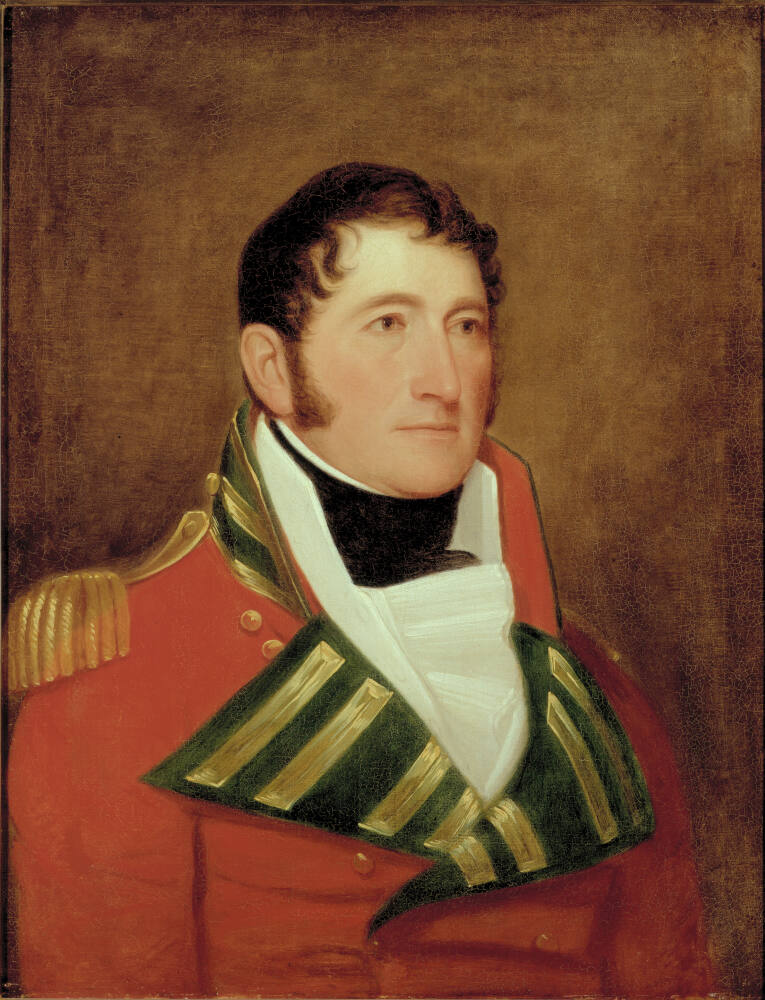
William McKay in 1816

Lt.-Colonel William McKay (1772 – 18 August 1832) is remembered for leading the Canadian Forces to victory at the Siege of Prairie du Chien during the War of 1812. After the war, he was appointed Superintendent of Indian Affairs at Drummond Island in what was then Upper Canada. Previous to the war, McKay was a noted fur trader who had travelled widely in Canada. He was a partner of the North West Company and a member of the Beaver Club at Montreal, Quebec. He was a brother of Alexander McKay, who accompanied Sir Alexander Mackenzie to the Pacific Ocean in 1793.

== Loyalist background ==
Born at Mohawk River Valley, he was the son of Donald McKay, a former soldier with the 78th Fraser Highlanders, and his wife Elspeth Kennedy. His father, a native of Golspie, Sutherland, fought at the Battle of Quebec. At the end of the Seven Years' War, his father was discharged from the British Army and settled at Mohawk River. During the American War of Independence, Donald McKay served with the King's Royal Regiment of New York and was afterwards one of the original United Empire Loyalists who settled at Glengarry County, Upper Canada.

== Fur Trade ==
In about 1790, William joined the North West Company, at about the same time as his brother Alexander McKay. He travelled widely in the regions north and west of the Great Lakes and traded along the Menominee River and afterwards at Portage la Prairie. He became a partner of the company in 1796 and retired in 1807, in which year he was also made a member of the Beaver Club at Montreal.

== War of 1812 ==
When war broke out with the United States of America, McKay almost immediately offered his services to the British army. His first major contribution was to make a journey of 500 miles (800 km) by canoe from Montreal to the British military post on St. Joseph Island on Lake Huron via York, the provincial capital, in only eight days. The news of the declaration of war he carried, along with orders from Major General Isaac Brock, the Commander in Upper Canada, allowed the British detachment to take the American detachment at Fort Mackinac by surprise. This victory encouraged many Native Americans to side with the British, resulting in further British victories in the west during the following year.

Later during the autumn and winter of 1812, McKay returned to Montreal to help raise the Corps of Canadian Voyageurs, a corps which transported supplies to Upper Canada. When this corps was transferred to the Commissariat, McKay became an officer in the Select Embodied Militia. During 1813, McKay was promoted to Major and given command of the Michigan Fencibles, a local quasi-regular unit recruited in the North West.

Early in 1814, the Americans had captured the isolated post of Prairie du Chien. This threatened the morale and allegiance of the Indians. Supported by the newly appointed Commander at Fort Mackinac, Lieutenant Colonel Robert McDouall, McKay (who now held the local rank of Lieutenant Colonel) mounted a scratch expedition of Fencibles, voyageurs and Indians which recaptured the post at the Siege of Prairie du Chien.

McKay was later appointed to head the Indian Department at Mackinac. When the war ended, he (and McDouall) opposed returning Mackinac and Prairie du Chien to the Americans, as it would place many Indians at their mercy, but was overruled.

== Family ==
In the North West, McKay took a country wife, Josette Latour. In 1808, at Montreal, he married Eliza Davidson, daughter of Judge Arthur Davidson (1743-1807) and his first wife, Jane, daughter of Alexander Fraser (1729-1799), former officer in the 78th Fraser Highlanders and afterwards Seigneur of La Martinière, Vitré and Saint-Gilles. McKay died of cholera in 1832, and was survived by one son,

- Robert McKay, was a lawyer at Montreal. He inherited the Seigneury of Saint-Gilles de Beaurivage, from his maternal uncle Walter Davidson (1790-1835), later selling it to his uncle, David Ross.
