= Fort Drummond (Drummond Island, Michigan) =

- U.S. National Register of Historic Places
- Michigan State Historic Site
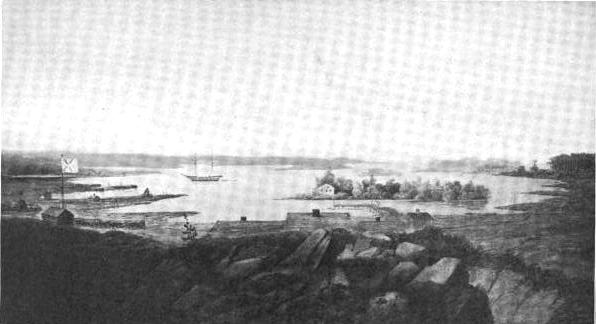
- Illustration of Fort Drummond

- Location within Michigan Location within the United States
- Interactive map
- Location: W end of Drummond Island, Drummond Island, Michigan
- Coordinates: 45°58′40″N 83°51′40″W
- Area: 84.5 acres (34.2 ha)
- Built: 1815
- NRHP reference No.: 69000069

Significant dates
- Added to NRHP: October 1, 1969
- Designated MSHS: November 27, 1956

Fort Drummond, also known as Fort Colyer or Fort Collier, was a military fort located on the west end of Drummond Island on Whitney Bay, in the vicinity of De Tour Village, Michigan. It is the only known military and civilian site established by British forces on American soil following the War of 1812. It was listed on the National Register of Historic Places in 1969 and designated a Michigan State Historic Site in 1956. The historic marker located at the ferry docks on Drummond Island.

== History ==
=== Establishment ===
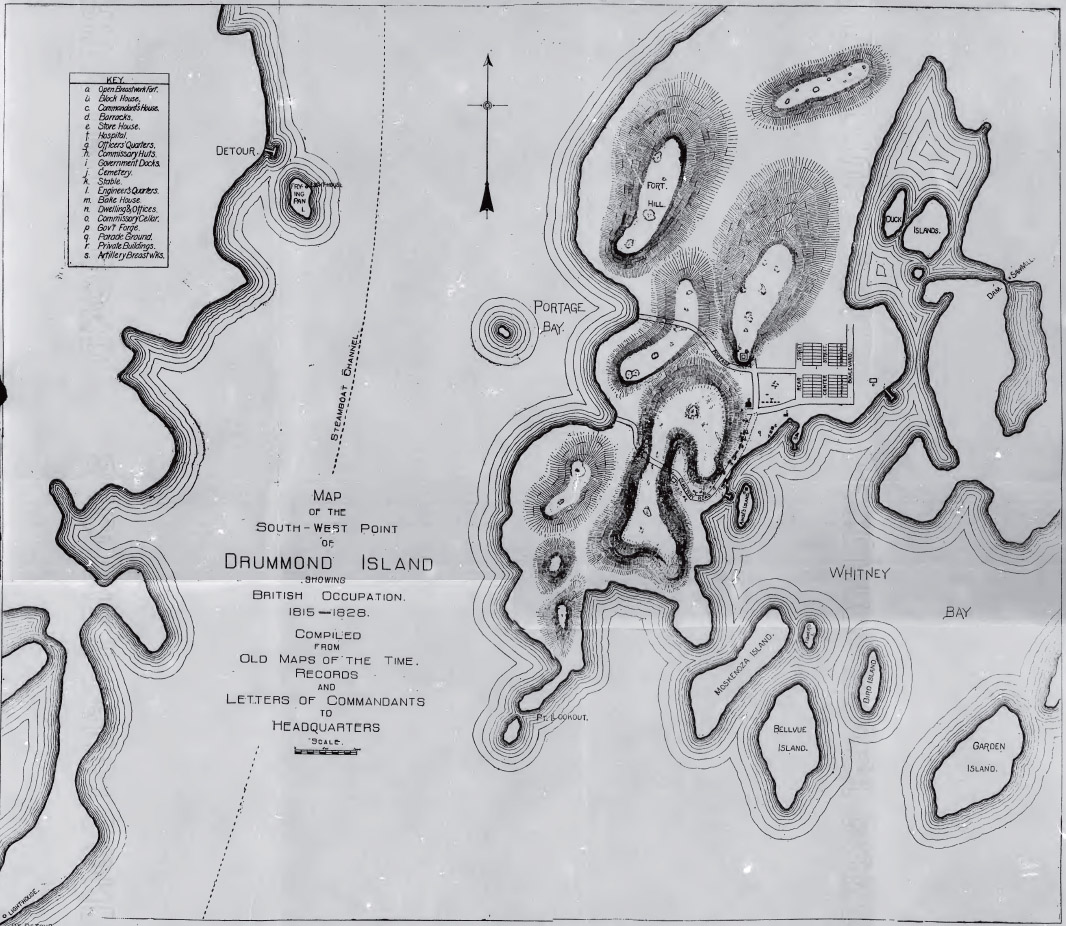
Map of Fort Drummond Site; created c. 1896

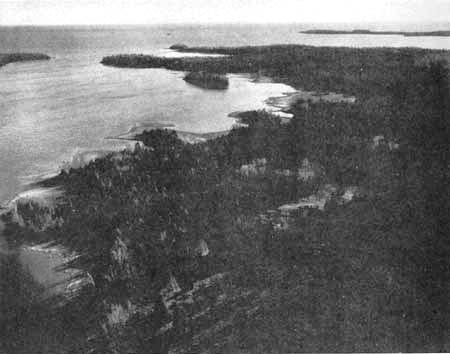
Whitney Bay, Site of Fort Drummond, c. 1959 photo

The Treaty of Ghent, signed in late 1814, required British troops to vacate the captured Fort Mackinac on Mackinac Island. The terms of the treaty, however, did not reach the Fort Mackinac garrison until May 15, 1815. The instructions to the fort's commanding officer, Lieutenant Colonel Robert McDonall, were to vacate Fort Mackinac and re-establish a garrison within British territory but relatively close to Mackinac Island. In particular, it was important that the new site be sufficiently close to the Straits of Mackinac that the British could continue to exert their considerable influence on the Native American peoples tribes and the fur trade in the upper Great Lakes region. McDonall considered several sites in the area, and finally settled on a site on the west end of the then-unnamed Drummond Island. The transfer of stores and men to the new site was slow to accomplish, and it took McDonall's garrison until July 18, 1815, to completely empty Fort Mackinac, which was then turned over to American forces.

Some of the forces under McDonall's command were mustered out in the latter part of 1815 and were shipped home, but by the time the transfer to Drummond Island was complete, the garrison consisted of some 350–400 people. These men were set to work constructing structures on Drummond Island, but due to lack of training, the progress was slow. In addition, there was some uncertainty as to whether Drummond Island was actually a British or American possession, according to the Treaty of Ghent, so the British were somewhat reluctant to put a substantial fortification in place. Eventually, buildings located on St. Joseph Island belonging to the North West Company were purchased, disassembled, and re-assembled in order to provide shelter for the coming winter.

There was still some uncertainty as to the final disposition of Drummond Island, and thus the British government was reluctant to expend much manpower or materiel fortifying Fort Drummond. Some few military structures were erected, but on the whole there was no real boundary between the military and civilian sections of the "fort". In 1816, McDonall resigned his commission and was replaced by Lt. Col. Maule; in 1817 Maule was replaced by Major Thomas Howard and then by Major James Winnett. Through this period the military emplacement on Drummond Island remained substantially as it had been at the end of 1815.

=== Abandonment ===
Winnett was relieved by Major Goff in June 1822. However, in 1822, it was determined that Drummond Island was actually part of the United States, per the Treaty of Ghent. Still, the British forces were in no hurry to leave Fort Drummond, and Goff was replaced in June 1824 by Lieutenant James J. Gaston, who was relieved in June 1827 by Lieutenant Thomas Carson. In the interim, a suitable location for the relocation of the Fort Drummond troops was sought; finally a site in what is now Penetanguishene, on the southeast corner of Georgian Bay, was tentatively selected.

By 1828, the United States government demanded that Fort Drummond be abandoned by the British, and they hurriedly did so, shipping troops and materiel to Penetanguishene. However, due to lack of shipping space, much food and personal belongings such as furniture were left behind by the departing British. American forces, led by Lieutenant T. Pierce Simonton, took possession of the fort on November 14, 1828. However, the US military did not occupy the fort. Some of the village houses remained occupied for at least the remainder of the winter, but it is not clear when the site was finally abandoned. At some point, what was likely a natural forest fire destroyed the remainder of the fort.

== Description ==
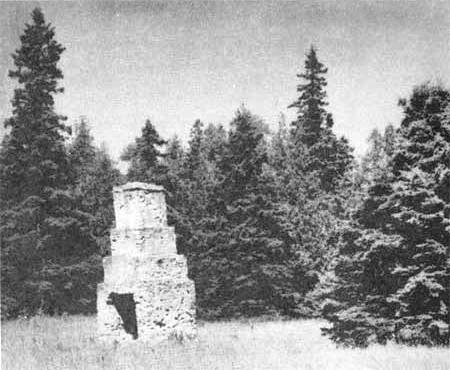
Chimney from Fort Drummond, c. 1959 photo

The settlement at Fort Drummond contained military structures as well as private houses. The settlement was centered around a parade ground fronting on the west side of the bay. Military barracks and commissary were located on the west side of the parade ground, and officer's quarters were haphazardly placed in the area. A "boulevard" ran along northward from the parade ground a good 2,000 feet (610 m), while a military road continued southward of the parade ground to the shore. The section of land east of the boulevard, between the boulevard and the bay, was reserved for gardens, while houses were built on the west side of the boulevard. The boulevard was lined by a row of poplar trees on each side.

Some of the houses were substantial, and a few were two stories. Other houses were "bark lodges," made of a pole framework covered with cedar. Kitchens for the houses were located some distance away, and much of the cooking and baking was done in a public bakery reserved for that purpose.

The cemetery was located to the west of the fort, some ways up the ridge rising from the bay. The cemetery was platted at 100 by 150 feet (30 by 46 m), and enclosed by a cedar rail fence. The cemetery likely holds around 300 people, many of the burials dating from the scurvy outbreak in the winter of 1815–6 and the smallpox outbreak of 1824. Many of the grave markers are now located in the Drummond Island Museum.

A lime quarry and kiln is located south of the town; this location was likely used to produce mortar for the chimneys. A saw mill was also located north of the town; this may or may not have been contemporaneous with Fort Drummond, but evidence of sawn logs in the fort buildings was confirmed. Some of the islands in Whitney Bay were also used by the fort, with the fort surgeon living on one and another used for artillery target practice.

As of 2012, the Fort Drummond site was located where the current quarry and has been destroyed during quarry operations, other parts of the surrounding sites are on private property, some only viewable from the water. At least one of the remaining chimneys has been incorporated into a privately owned cabin which is not open to general public. The Fort Drummond site contains 74 features, most of which are the remains of chimneys and structural platforms. There are also two wells, two wharves, and a cemetery. Faint traces of foundations can still be seen. All are located on private property.

Images of Fort Drummond area, c. 1896

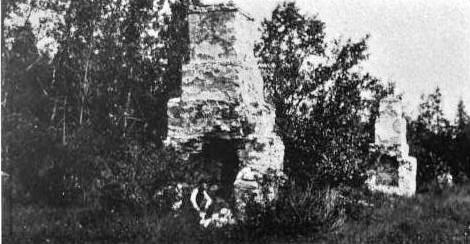
Remains of the barracks

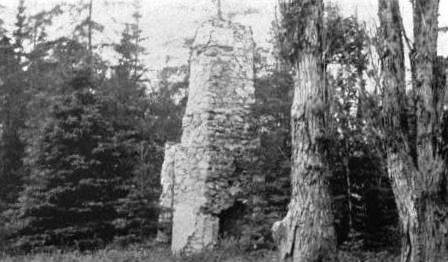
Remains of the officer's quarters

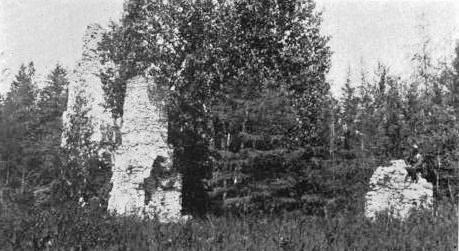
Remains of the officer's quarters

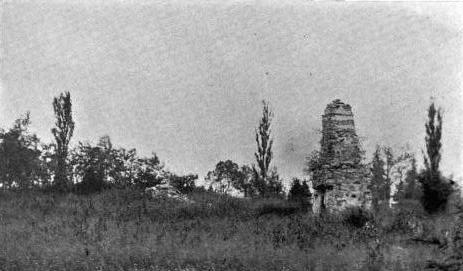
Ruins on the hill

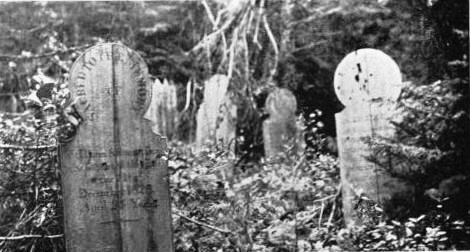
Headstones in the cemetery; none remain

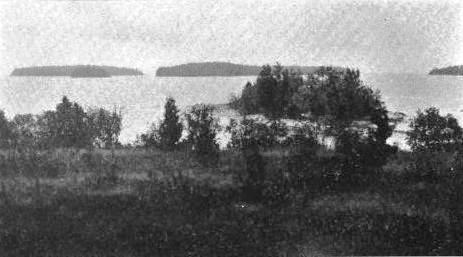
Harbor serving the fort

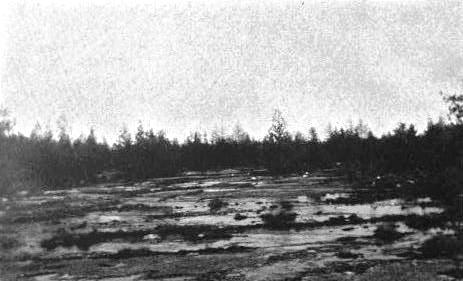
Looking out over the parade ground

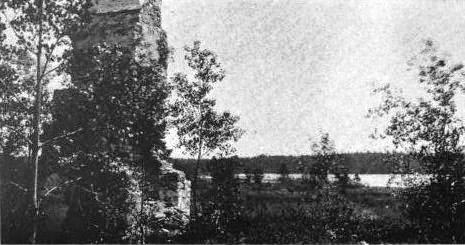
Looking out over the parade ground toward the harbor

== Works cited ==
- Cook, Samuel Fletcher (1896). Drummond Island: The Story of the British Occupation, 1815–1828. R. Smith Printing.
