= Robert McDouall =

Major-General Robert McDouall, CB (March 1774 – 15 November 1848) was a Scottish-born officer in the British Army, who saw much action during the Napoleonic Wars and the Anglo-American War of 1812. He is best known for serving as the commandant of Fort Mackinac from 1814 until the end of the War of 1812.

== Early life and career ==
Robert was born in Stranraer in Scotland, where his father was a magistrate. He was educated at Felsted School, and his father and uncle placed him in a business in London, hoping he would become a merchant. Instead, in 1797, he purchased a commission in the 8th (The King's) Regiment of Foot. He saw much service with the regiment, in the Egyptian campaign in 1801, and as a Captain at the Battle of Copenhagen (1807) and in the Invasion of Martinique (1809).

== Service in Canada ==
The 1st Battalion of the 8th Foot were posted to Canada in 1810. Two years later, war broke out between Britain and the United States. McDouall was appointed aide de camp to the Governor General of Canada, Lieutenant General Sir George Prevost.

On 24 June 1813, he was appointed major in the Glengarry Light Infantry, a Scottish unit raised in Canada. He was sent to Britain with despatches, was made a brevet lieutenant colonel in the Army on 29 July, and returned to Canada.

== Mackinac Island ==
No doubt due to Prevost's influence, McDouall was appointed Commandant of the post on Mackinac Island. The island was an important American trading post on Lake Huron. It had been captured by the British and Indians by surprise early in the war, thereby inducing many more Indians to ally themselves with Britain. In 1813, the Americans had won the Battle of Lake Erie, which had isolated the island from supply via Lake Erie.

McDouall and a party of soldiers from the Royal Newfoundland Fencibles, voyageurs and craftsmen journeyed north in the depths of winter from York, the provincial capital of Upper Canada, to the Nottawasaga River near present day Edenvale, Ontario, where they constructed batteaux. (Glengarry Landing on the Nottawasaga River, where McDouall oversaw the construction of the flotilla, was designated a National Historic Site of Canada in 1923.) When the river unfroze in the spring, they sailed and paddled the length of Georgian Bay and Lake Huron to reach Mackinac with vital supplies. McDouall took up his post as commandant and began improving the defences of the island.

McDouall's responsibilities covered a very large geographical area. Shortly after his arrival, he learned that the Americans had captured the post of Prairie du Chien, threatening the allegiance of some of the Indians. He dispatched an expedition under William McKay which succeeded in recapturing Prairie du Chien, although it reduced his own strength.

An American expedition for the recapture of Mackinac Island, consisting of five warships with 700 troops, appeared off the island on 26 July 1814. McDouall's defences withstood an American bombardment and in the Battle of Mackinac Island, Indians with some of McDouall's troops defeated an American landing and inflicted heavy loss. The Americans then attempted to starve out the garrison with a blockade, but in the Engagement on Lake Huron, the blockading vessels were captured, securing the British hold on the entire region for the remainder of the war.

The War ended in 1815. McDouall publicly regretted that the Treaty of Ghent restored Mackinac Island to America. He moved his post to the newly-built Fort Drummond on Drummond Island, retaining command of the remaining British forces in the area, until leaving for home in June 1816.

== Later career ==
In spite of his record, McDouall never again saw active service, although he was appointed Companion of the Bath in February 1817 and was promoted colonel in July 1830 and major general in November 1841. He spent the remainder of his life on half pay retirement in Stranraer. He never married and devoted much time and money to the Free Church of Scotland including funds to colleges in Edinburgh and Toronto.
