= USS Rodgers (DD-254) =

Clemson-class destroyer

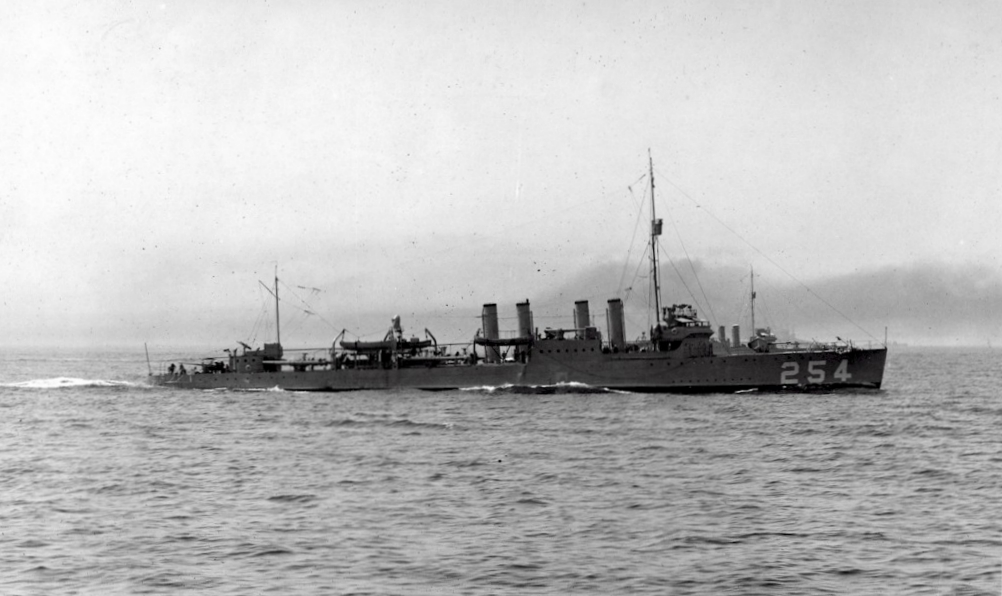

History

United States
- Name: USS Rodgers
- Namesake: John Rodgers (1812–1882)
- Builder: Bethlehem Shipbuilding Corporation, Fore River Shipyard, Quincy
- Laid down: 25 September 1918
- Launched: 26 April 1919
- Commissioned: 22 July 1919
- Decommissioned: 23 October 1940
- Stricken: 8 January 1941
- Identification: DD-254
- Fate: Transferred to United Kingdom, 23 October 1940

United Kingdom
- Name: HMS Sherwood
- Commissioned: 23 October 1940
- Identification: Pennant number: I80
- Fate: Sold for scrap, 1945

General characteristics
- Class & type: Clemson-class destroyer
- Displacement: 1,190 tons
- Length: 314 ft 5 in (95.83 m)
- Beam: 31 ft (9.4 m)
- Draft: 9 ft 10 in (3.00 m)
- Propulsion: 26,500 shp (19,800 kW); geared turbines, 2 screws
- Speed: 34.4 kn (63.7 km/h; 39.6 mph)
- Range: 4,900 nmi (9,100 km; 5,600 mi) at 15 kn (28 km/h; 17 mph)
- Complement: 131 officers and enlisted
- Armament: 4 x 4 in (100 mm) guns; 1 x 3 in (76 mm) gun; 12 x 21 inch (533 mm) torpedo tubes

The third USS Rodgers (DD-254) was a Clemson-class destroyer in the United States Navy, transferred to the Royal Navy and served as HMS Sherwood (I80) during World War II.

== Service history ==
=== As USS Rodgers ===
She was named for John Rodgers (1772–1838), his son, John Rodgers (1812–1882) and his great grandson, John Rodgers (1881–1926).

Rodgers was laid down as Kalk 25 September 1918 by the Bethlehem Shipbuilding Corporation; renamed Rodgers 23 December 1918; launched 26 April 1919; sponsored by Miss Helen T. Rodgers, granddaughter of Commodore John Rodgers; and commissioned 22 July 1919.

Rodgers served with Division 28, Destroyers, Atlantic Fleet, until the spring of 1922 when she steamed to Philadelphia for inactivation. Decommissioned 20 July of that year, she remained in reserve until after the outbreak of World War II in Europe.

Rodgers, recommissioned 18 December 1939, again served briefly with the Atlantic Fleet, and in October 1940 moved to Halifax, Nova Scotia where she joined other destroyers being transferred to the United Kingdom in exchange for bases in the Western Hemisphere.

=== As HMS Sherwood ===
She decommissioned 23 October 1940 and was transferred and commissioned the same day for service in the 4th "Town" Flotilla as HMS Sherwood (I80).

Sherwood sailed for the United Kingdom 1 November. Diverted en route, she participated in the search for survivors of ships lost from convoy HX 84 and in the subsequent hunt for the German cruiser Admiral Scheer, when returning to Canada for repairs. On 18 November, she arrived at Belfast, continued on to Portsmouth, from where, after overhaul, she sailed to join the 12th Escort Group, Western Approaches Command at Londonderry Port. Transferred, with her group, to Iceland in April 1941, she joined in the hunt for the German battleship Bismarck in May. On 28 May, the day after the German battleship had been sunk, the ship assisted in rescue operations for survivors from British destroyer HMS Mashona.

During the summer, Sherwood underwent repairs in the Clyde, and then returned to Londonderry Port, from where she operated, first with the 2nd Escort Group, then with the 22nd, into the new year, 1942. In February and March, she accompanied carriers during trials, and, after another yard period, April to August, served as a target ship for training aircraft from the Royal Naval Air Station at Fearn, Scotland. In the autumn, she again crossed the Atlantic and served with the Newfoundland Command until she returned to Londonderry Port in February 1943. During March and April she escorted a convoy to Tunisia and back, but by May she again needed major repairs. Worn out, she was taken out of active service at Chatham, stripped of usable parts and ordnance and towed to the Humber where she was beached in shallow water for use as an aircraft target. Her hulk was scrapped in 1945.
