= USS John Rodgers (DD-983) =

Spruance-class destroyer

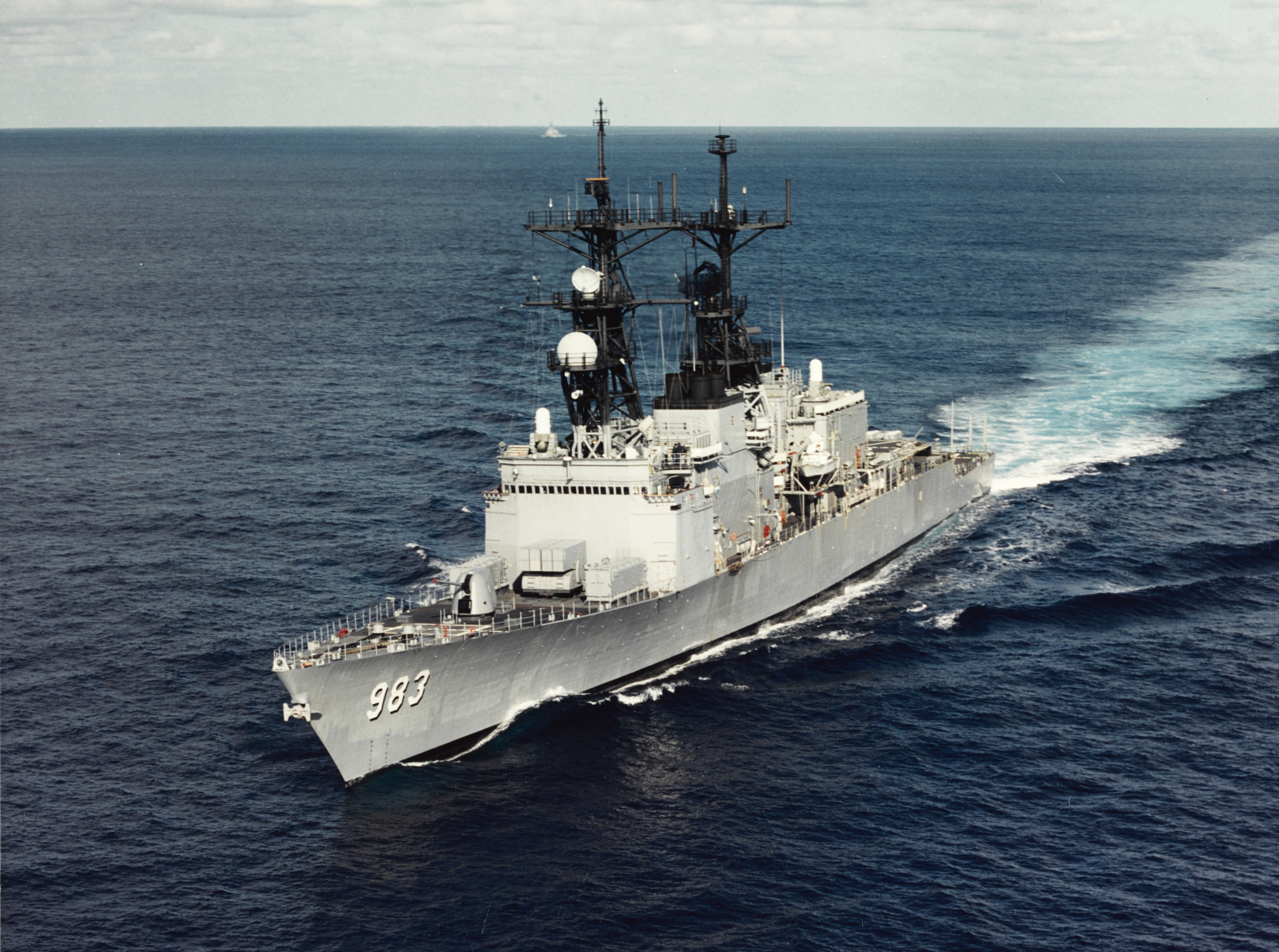
- USS John Rodgers

History

United States
- Name: John Rodgers
- Namesake: Three generations of the Rodgers family who served in the USN
- Ordered: 15 January 1974
- Builder: Ingalls Shipbuilding
- Laid down: 12 August 1976
- Launched: 25 February 1978
- Acquired: 25 June 1979
- Commissioned: 14 July 1979
- Decommissioned: 4 September 1998
- Stricken: 4 September 1998
- Home port: Charleston (1979-1995); Mayport (1995-1998)
- Identification: Callsign: NYQL; Hull number: DD-983
- Motto: Sea Eagle Triumphant
- Fate: Broken up in Brownsville Texas 30 December 2006
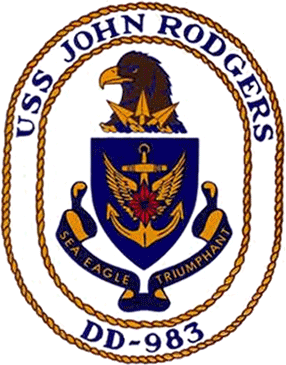
- Badge

General characteristics
- Class & type: Spruance-class destroyer
- Displacement: 8,040 long tons (8,170 t) full load
- Length: 529 ft (161 m) waterline; 563 ft (172 m) overall
- Beam: 55 ft (17 m)
- Draft: 29 ft (8.8 m)
- Installed power: 3 × 501-K17 generator sets (2,000 kW (2,700 hp) each)
- Propulsion: 4 × General Electric LM2500 gas turbines, 2 shafts, 80,000 shp (60 MW)
- Speed: 32.5 knots (60.2 km/h; 37.4 mph)
- Range: 6,000 nmi (11,000 km; 6,900 mi) at 20 knots (37 km/h; 23 mph)
- Complement: 19 officers, 315 enlisted
- Sensors & processing systems: AN/SPS-40 air search radar; AN/SPG-60 fire control radar; AN/SPS-55 surface search radar; AN/SPQ-9 gun fire control radar; Mark 23 TAS automatic detection and tracking radar; AN/SPS-65 missile fire control radar; AN/SQS-53 bow-mounted active sonar; AN/SQR-19 TACTAS towed array passive sonar; Naval Tactical Data System
- Electronic warfare & decoys: AN/SLQ-32 electronic warfare system; AN/SLQ-25 Nixie torpedo countermeasures; Mark 36 SRBOC decoy launching system; AN/SLQ-49 inflatable decoys
- Armament: 2 × 5 in (127 mm) 54 caliber Mark 45 dual purpose guns; 2 × 20 mm Phalanx CIWS Mark 15 guns; 1 × 8 cell ASROC launcher (removed); 1 × 8 cell NATO Sea Sparrow Mark 29 missile launcher; 2 × quadruple Harpoon missile canisters; 2 × Mark 32 triple 12.75 in (324 mm) torpedo tubes (Mk 46 torpedoes); 1 × 61 cell Mk 41 VLS launcher for Tomahawk missiles
- Aircraft carried: 2 × Sikorsky SH-60 Seahawk LAMPS III helicopters
- Aviation facilities: Flight deck and enclosed hangar for up to two medium-lift helicopters

USS John Rodgers (DD-983) was a Spruance-class destroyer and the sixth ship of the United States Navy to be named for the three generations of the Rodgers family who served in the navy.

== Construction ==
John Rodgers was laid down on 12 August 1976 by Ingalls Shipbuilding, Pascagoula, Mississippi. The vessel was launched on 18 March 1978, sponsored by Mrs. Roy C. Smith Jr., the great, great-granddaughter of Commodore John Rodgers, and commissioned on 14 July 1979.

== Operational history ==
After her launch from Pascagoula, John Rodgers sailed to her home port of Charleston where she was loaded with ammunition before undergoing several days of training. Following a three-week intermediate availability period, John Rodgers held final contract trials at the beginning of November 1979 and returned to the area from 7–9 December to exercise with the aircraft carrier Saratoga (CV-60) and destroyer USS Barry (DD-933).

=== Middle East Deployment ===
On 18 November 1980, John Rodgers departed for the Mediterranean to begin her first overseas deployment, operating independently and with other members of the task group in the western and central Mediterranean. Throughout the early 1980s, John Rodgers sailed into the Atlantic, Pacific, and Indian Oceans under her commanding officer, Commander Wagner. Under U.S. policy, John Rodgers sailed into the Persian Gulf in support of Iraq during the Iran-Iraq war John Rodgers crossed the equator while en route to Mombasa, Kenya, resulting in the initiation of the "Pollywogs" (those who have not crossed the equator) by the "Shellbacks" (those who have crossed the equator). During this period, John Rodgers made port calls on four continents, including Panama, Spain, Italy, France, Monaco, England, Germany, Finland, Denmark, Morocco, Egypt, Israel, Bahrain and Kenya.

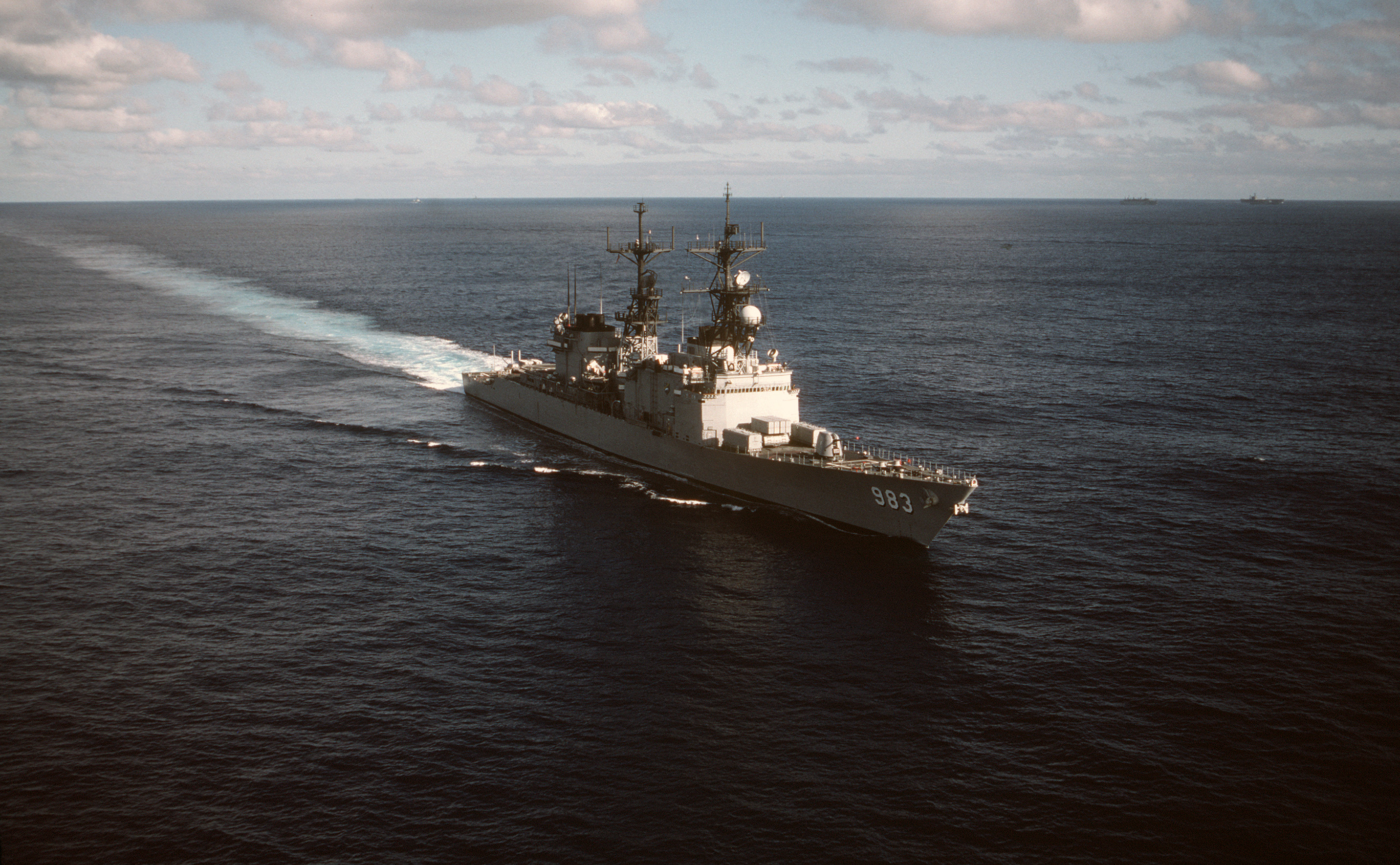
USS John Rodgers on 12 August 1988

On September 16, 1983, while operating off Lebanon, John Rodgers became the very first ship to use the 5" 54 caliber Mark 45 gun in actual combat after firing on Syrian controlled portions of Lebanon in response to Syrian shelling near the residence of the U.S. ambassador and U.S. Marines stationed at the Beirut airport. On 19 September, U.S. policy shift from presence to direct support of Lebanese Army forces defending the strategically important village of Suk El Gharb in the Chouf Mountains east of Beirut. Along with Virginia, the two ships fired a total of 338 5-inch rounds. Ongoing fire support missions continued through 21 September.

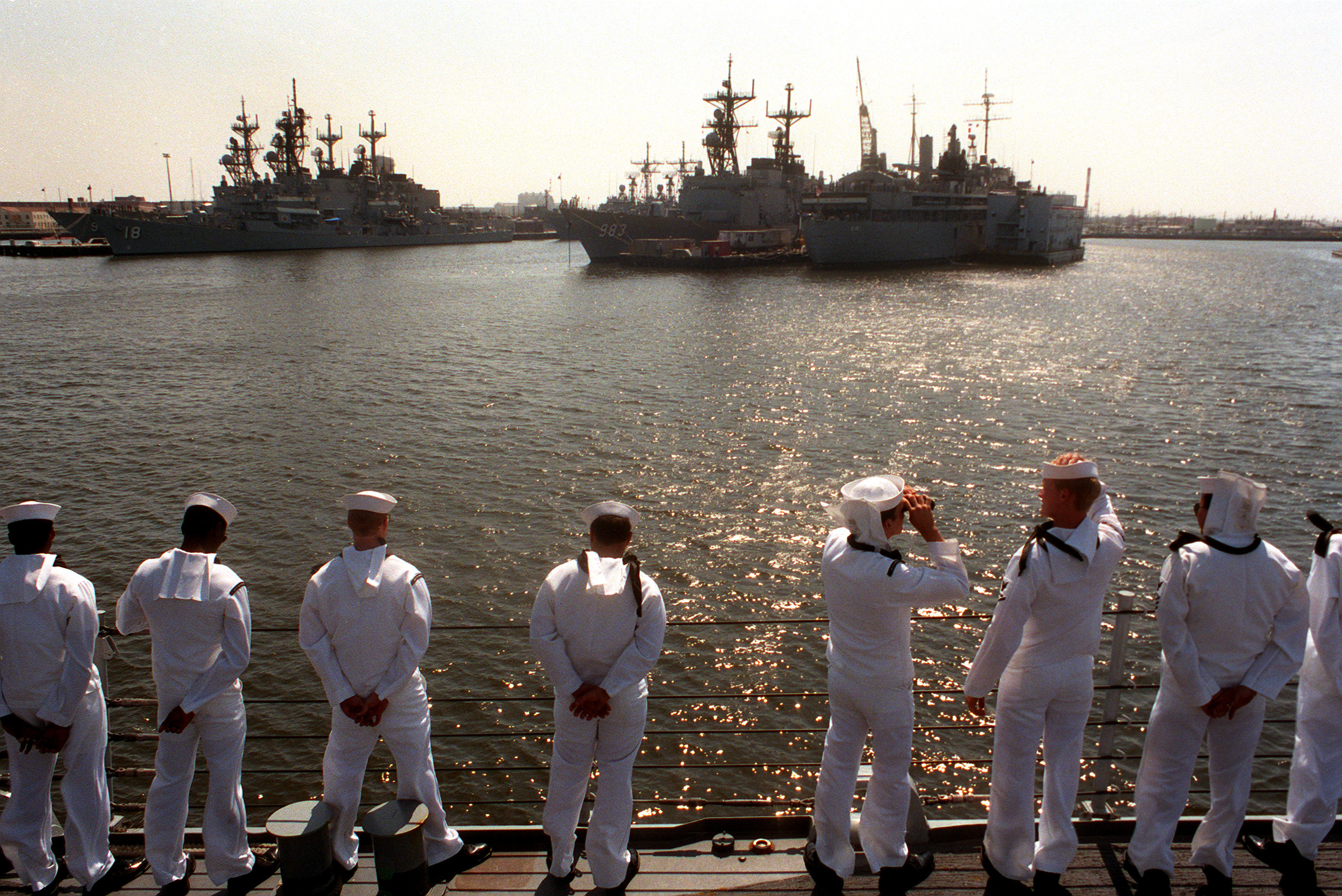
USS Sierra and USS John Rodgers in Charleston, 1991

John Rodgers immediately began operations in support of Operation Desert Shield after the Invasion of Kuwait by Iraq, and performed patrols in the Mediterranean and Red Seas throughout the conflict.

=== Overhaul ===
Upon her return from the North Atlantic on 29 April 1984, John Rodgers offloaded weapons and completed an intermediate maintenance availability. John Rodgers arrived at Ingalls Shipyard on 10 June and commenced overhaul, which continued into the early months of 1985. Work completed on the ship included installation of the Tomahawk Weapon System, Target Acquisition System, MOD 1 conversion to the Mk.45 5-inch/54 lightweight gun system, MOD 10 conversion to the Mk. 86 gun fire control system, and improvements to the SQS-53 sonar. John Rodgers underwent sea trials from 5–7 March and completed overhaul on 13 March, 57 days ahead of schedule.

=== South America Deployment ===
In 1993, John Rodgers departed as the flagship for Commander, South Atlantic Force during UNITAS XXXIV under Rear Admiral. (lower half) Wirt R. Fladd, USN. During these several months of her long deployment, she cooperated with the navies of various South American nations, while making a number of goodwill port calls. Additionally, she traversed the Panama Canal and crossed the Equator on the way to South America. This resulted in the initiation of the "Pollywogs" (those who have not crossed the equator) by the "Shellbacks" (those who have crossed the equator). Lastly, she traversed the inland waterway from West to East at the tip of South American before continuing the cruise up the East coast of the continent. Stops during this cruise included Caracas, Venezuela; Cartagena, Colombia; Lima, Peru; Valparaiso, Chile; Buenos Aires, Argentina; Montevideo, Uruguay; Rio de Janeiro and Fortaleza, Brazil.

=== Later Deployments ===
In 1995 she deployed as part of the NATO Standing Naval Force Atlantic. Because of active hostilities among the countries formed following the breakup of the Former Republic of Yugoslavia, she spent much of this deployment engaged in Maritime Interdiction Operations in the Adriatic Sea in support of Operation Sharp Guard, making calls throughout the Mediterranean coast. From January to March 1996, John Rodgers participated in joint exercises with the British Royal Navy and Royal Marines in the waters around Scotland. During this time she also made port visits to Edinburgh, Scotland; Bremerhaven, Germany; and Amsterdam, Netherlands.

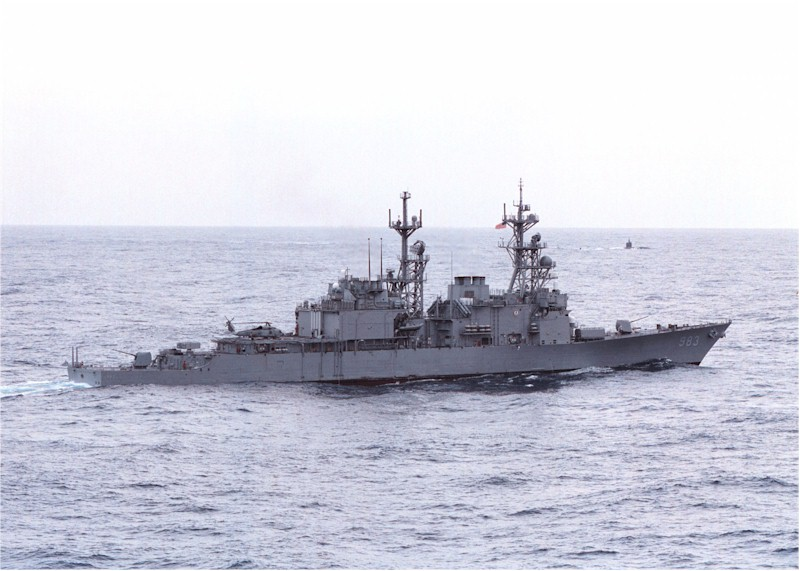
USS John Rodgers in the Atlantic Ocean on 10 October 1997

On 3 October 1997 John Rodgers departed on her last deployment in company with the Mediterranean Amphibious Ready Group (MARG) 98-1 centered on USS Guam (LPH-9). This MARG relieved another MARG centered on USS Kearsarge (LHD-3). As a part of this deployment, John Rodgers participated in the Bright Star 97 naval exercise hosted by the Egyptian navy and also participated in the Reliant Mermaid exercise conducted with Israel and Turkey in January 1998. John Rodgers participated in five other major exercises on this deployment. Port visits on this deployment included Spain, France, Italy, Egypt, Israel, Greece and Turkey. By the end of her final deployment, John Rodgers had made eight major deployments, including extensive operations in the Mediterranean Sea, Black Sea, and the Persian Gulf. She also took part in numerous counter drug operations in the Caribbean Sea.

At various times during her career, John Rodgers served as the flagship for COMDESRONs 14, 20, 22, 32, 36, Canadian COMDESRON ONE, COMSOLANT, COMSTANAVFORLANT, and WEAUCONMARFOR, and also served as the host ship for the Change of Command of COMSIXTHFLT in 1988 and COMSTANAVFORLANT in 1995.

=== Fate ===
John Rodgers was decommissioned and stricken on 4 September 1998; she was stored at Philadelphia, awaiting sale for scrap. By 2005 she had been sold to International Shipbreaking Limited of Brownsville, Texas although scrapping work had yet to be completed. On 29 December 2005, John Rodgers (DD-983) was spotted heading south along the east coast of south Florida under tow. She has since been broken up for scrap.

== Awards ==
John Rogers earned the following awards:

Joint Meritorious Unit Award		Navy Unit Commendation
Meritorious Unit Commendation	Battle Effectiveness Award	National Defense Service Medal
Southwest Asia Service Medal	Humanitarian Service Medal	Sea Service Deployment Ribbon
Armed Forces Service Medal	Special Operations Service Ribbon	

== Coat of arms ==
=== Shield ===
The shield of John Rodgers symbolizes the service of three generations of the Rodgers family. The anchor represents the service of Commodore John Rodgers, who acted as president of the Board of Naval Commissioners, following the War of 1812, serving until 1837. The compass rose is symbolic of the service of his son, Rear Admiral John Rodgers, who led exploring expeditions in waters off China and through the Bering Strait in 1855. The wings on the crest refer to the service of Commander John Rodgers II who was a pioneer of naval aviation, and the great-grandson of Commodore Rodgers.

=== Crest ===
The sea eagle, a sharp-eyed, marine bird-of-prey, represents the ship's primary mission of detection and tracking, with the addition of incredibly deadly striking ability. The three arrowheads refer to the multi-mission capabilities of the destroyer, as well as the naval service of the father, son, and great-grandson for whom the ship is named.

=== Motto ===
Sea Eagle Triumphant
