= USS John Rodgers =

Three ships of the United States Navy have been USS John Rodgers for John Rodgers, his son, John Rodgers and his great grandson, John Rodgers.

- USS John Rodgers (1917), was a lighthouse tender and part of the Lighthouse Service run by the Navy from 1917 to 1919
- USS John Rodgers (DD-574), was a Fletcher-class destroyer, commissioned in 1943 and decommissioned in 1946
- USS John Rodgers (DD-983), was a Spruance-class destroyer, commissioned in 1979 and decommissioned in 1998

== See also ==
- USS Rodgers
