= Action of 25 April 1898 =

Military engagement during the Spanish-American War

Coordinates: 23.069°N 81.176°W

- Part of the Spanish–American War
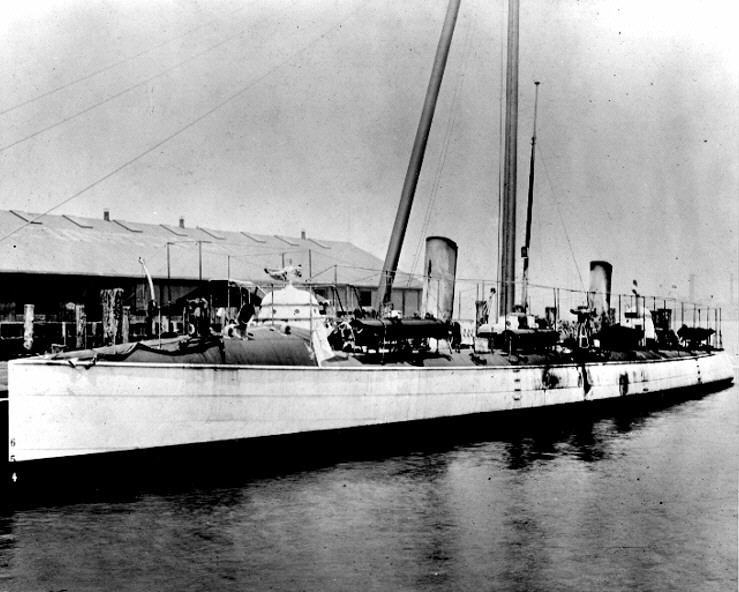
- USS Foote, c. 1898
Date	25 April 1898
Location	Off Cárdenas, Caribbean Sea
Result	Spanish victory

Belligerents
Spain	United States

Commanders and leaders
Antonio Rendón	William Rodgers

Strength
Gunboat Ligera	Torpedo boat Foote

Casualties and losses
Ligera damaged	Foote damaged

The action of 25 April 1898 was a minor single ship action of the Spanish–American War fought near Cárdenas, Cuba, between the American torpedo boat USS Foote under Lieutenant William Ledyard Rodgers and the Spanish gunboat Ligera under Lieutenant Antonio Pérez Rendón. After a fierce exchange of fire, Foote, seriously damaged, was forced to withdraw. The engagement was the first battle of the war, as well as the first naval Spanish success.

== Background ==
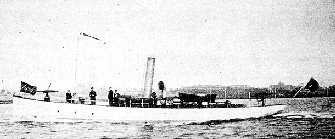
Spanish 3rd class gunboat Ligera.

At the outbreak of the Spanish–American War, the United States Navy detached a force of two protected cruisers, 16 auxiliary cruisers, 12 torpedo boats and many other units including armed tugboats, yachts and colliers to blockade the Cuban coasts with the aim of cutting off the supplies of the Spanish Army. It proved to be a difficult task due to the large number of inlets, keys and natural ports of that coasts that allowed the much inferior Spanish vessels to break the blockade many times. One of that ports was Cárdenas. The naval units based there were the gunboats Alerta, Ligera and Antonio López, the last a former tugboat operated by the Spanish Line, which had ceded it to the navy. The port was supposedly defended by two shore-batteries, but the Spanish accounts didn't mention their presence prior to their installation on 12 May. The entrances to the bay were covered by 20 Bustamante mines, most of them defective, and a 70-men company of marines had been detached to garrison the town. The gunboats belonged to the Spanish Caribbean squadron under Admiral Vicente Manterola, and most of its units had been described as "unhelpful even to the coastal police". Antonio López, nevertheless, had captured the filibuster ship Genoveva and the schooner William Todd few years before.

== Battle ==
Antonio Pérez Rendón.

On 25 April, the Ligera patrolled the entrance of Cárdenas' port. Her commander was Lieutenant Antonio Pérez Rendón y Sánchez, an experienced Cádiz-born officer who had seen action against the Cuban insurgents many times during the war. The American torpedo boat Foote, a 142-ton warship armed with three 1-pounder guns and three 457 mm torpedo tubes, was sighted off Cayo Diana. Both ships soon opened fire on each other. The American fired more rapidly, but less accurately. Foote fired about 70 shots, of which only one hit Ligera, while Ligera only managed 10. The damage and casualties aboard the Spanish ship were minimal. Foote, meanwhile, took several hits that caused heavy damage. Foote left the combat enveloped in smoke with its boilers badly damaged. At the time the Spanish believed that the U.S. torpedo boat was the USS Cushing.

== Aftermath ==
Antonio Rendón was awarded with the Naval Cross of Maria Cristina for his success, which was met with public acclaim. Subsequently, the American and Spanish navies fought several more engagements near Cárdenas. On 8 May, the three Spanish gunboats under Rendón surprised the American torpedo boat USS Winslow, which was part of a small flotilla led by the gunboat USS Machias. The most important of the battles around Cárdenas, the Battle of Cárdenas, took place on 11 May, when Rendón and his ships repulsed an attack against the port.

Spanish naval successes of the war were mainly due to the actions of their small coastguard vessels. Besides the actions off Cárdenas they faced the American Mosquito Squadron with some success in Manzanillo, Cienfuegos and even in Philippine waters. There the gunboat Elcano captured the American bark Saranac on 26 April 1898. Saranac, under Captain Bartaby, was carrying 1,640 tons of coal from Newcastle, New South Wales, to Iloilo, for Admiral Dewey's fleet.

== Order of battle ==
Spain

Gunboat

- Ligera

United States

Torpedo boat

- USS Foote

== Notes ==
- Donald H. Dyal, Brian B. Carpenter, Mark A. Thomas, Historical Dictionary of the Spanish American War. Greenwood Publishing Group (1996). ISBN 0-313-28852-6
- Agustín Ramón Rodríguez González, Buques de la armada española a través de la fotografía, 1849–1900. Agualarga (2001). ISBN 84-95088-37-1
- Agustín Ramón Rodríguez González, Operaciones de la Guerra de 1898: una revisión crítica. Actas Editorial (1998). ISBN 84-87863-72-8
- Agustín Ramón Rodríguez González, Victorias por Mar de los Españoles. Grafite Ediciones (2006). ISBN 978-84-96281-38-7
- David Solar, Una guerra por encima de las posibilidades españolas, in Historia y Comunicación Social, nº 3: La guerra del 98 y los medios de comunicación. Departamento de Historia de la Comunicación Social, Servicio de Publicaciones, Universidad Complutense de Madrid (1998). ISSN 1137-0734
