= Sion Hill =

Historic house in Maryland, United States

- U.S. National Register of Historic Places
- U.S. National Historic Landmark
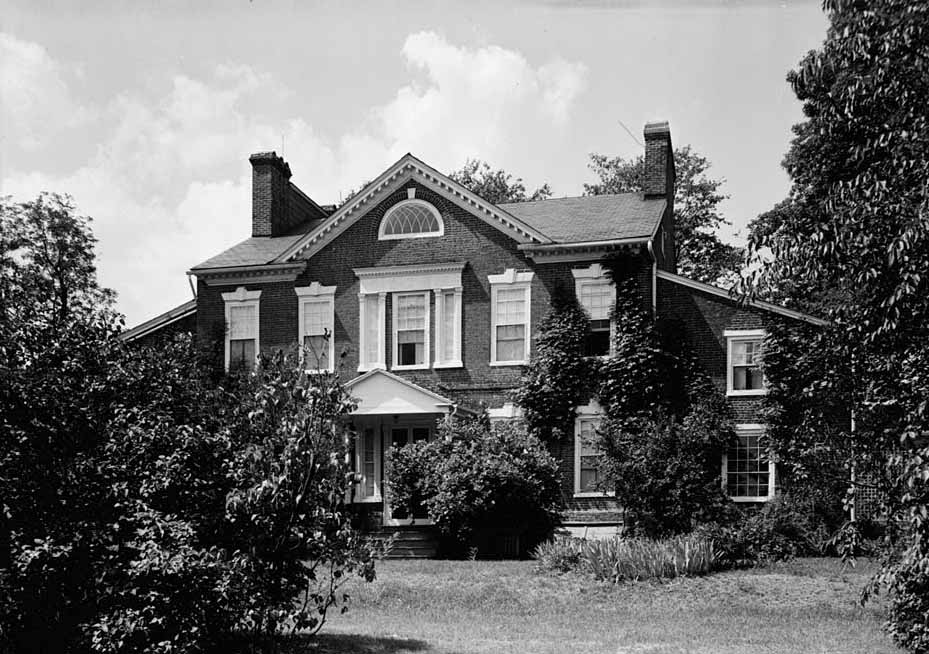
- Sion Hill in 1936

- Location within Maryland Location within the United States
- Nearest city: 2026 Level Road, Havre de Grace, Maryland
- Coordinates: 39°33′54″N 76°7′43″W
- Architectural style: Federal, Georgian
- NRHP reference No.: 90000608

Significant dates
- Added to NRHP: April 30, 1990
- Designated NHL: April 27, 1992

Sion Hill is a National Historic Landmark in Havre de Grace, Maryland, notable as an example of high-style Federal architecture and as the home of a family of prominent officers of the United States Navy.

Work began at Sion Hill around 1785 for the Rev. John Ireland, but progressed slowly, as the unfinished house was sold in 1795 to Gordon Denison. In 1799 the still-unfinished house passed to Denison's daughter Minerva, who was to marry Commodore John Rodgers in 1806. Together, they finished the house. Descendants of John and Minerva Rodgers, including son John Rodgers II, who commanded ironclads in the US Civil War, Rear Admiral John Augustus Rodgers (1848-1933) and his son, naval aviator John Rodgers (1881-1926), owned the house until 2020.

== History ==
John Ireland bought the unimproved property above Havre de Grace in 1787 and began construction on the Sion Hill Seminary, intended as a boys' school. Ireland sold the property with the unfinished house in 1795 to Connecticut merchant Gideon Denison. Denison was apparently a real estate speculator, believing that Havre de Grace would expand significantly, and accumulated 1,820 acres (7.4 km^{2}) around the house. Denison died in 1799, and his daughter Minerva inherited. After her marriage to John Rodgers at Sion Hill, the couple added the house's details. After Rodgers' retirement from active naval service in 1815 he returned to Sion Hill, continuing to advise on naval policy. Rodgers died in 1838. Minerva survived until 1877, but gave Sion Hill and 1,800 acres (7.3 km^{2}) of surrounding land to her oldest son, Robert Smith Rodgers (1809-1891).

Robert Smith Rodgers, a civil engineer, enlisted in the Union Army as a private, rose to the rank of colonel during the American Civil War and commanded the 2nd Maryland Eastern Shore Infantry Regiment. In 1841 he married Sarah Perry, daughter of Commander Matthew C. Perry. The son of Robert S. and Sarah Perry Rodgers, Rear Admiral John Augustus Rodgers inherited the house and lived there until his death in 1933.

Sion Hill was the site of an early aviation record. On September 16, 1911, ENS John Rodgers became the first man in America to visit his parents by airplane. He landed in a field about 200 yards from the house where his father, Rear Admiral John Rodgers, his mother Elizabeth, and brother Robert greeted him. His intention was to leave the next day for New York where his cousin Calbraith Perry Rodgers was to depart Sheepshead Bay for San Francisco at 3 pm that afternoon to compete for the $50,000 Hearst Prize.

The house then passed to Rodgers' widow, Elizabeth Chambers Rodgers, who in 1944 left the property to a descendant of the first John Rodgers, John Meigs, John Rodger's great-grandson and grandson of Montgomery C. Meigs, who had married Louisa Rodgers. John Meigs in turn left the property to Montgomery Meigs Green in 1946. His wife, Ann, gave it to their son Jonathan Green in 2004.

The house was rented in the 2010s, and put up for sale on September 11, 2018, for $1.299 million. It sold for $900,000 on July 14, 2020.

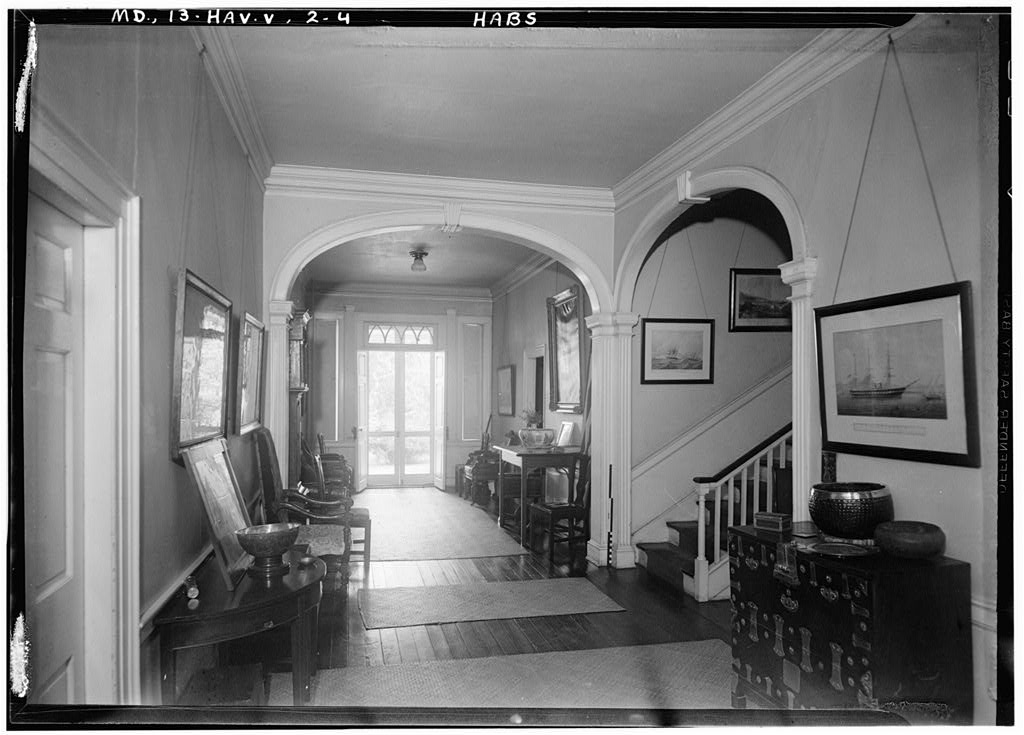
Interior view of Sion Hill, Havre de Grace, MD

== Description ==
Sion Hill is a brick three-part house with a five-bay 2 1/2-story central block flanked by one-bay shed-roofed wings. The main facade faces south toward Chesapeake Bay. This side features a pedimented porch at the entrance door, a three-part second floor window above, and a lunette in the attic gable. Typical windows are nine-over-nine sashes under flared stone lintels with projecting keystones. The rear elevation is similar, but somewhat simplified. The main roof is a cross-gable with smaller gables front and back. Large chimneys flank the roof, and are traditionally stated to have been built especially tall to be visible from the upper Chesapeake.

The interior features a center hall plan. The summer and winter dining rooms, of equal size, lie to the east, with two parlors and the main stairs to the west. The plan plays with proportions; it is a three-part composition with one third a single unit, one third divided in half, and one third divided in three. The hall features a pilastered segmental arch, with a similar arch at the stair alcove. Woodwork is almost all original and of high quality throughout. The west wing was a schoolroom with dormitory space above, and retains its layout. The east wing was the kitchen wing, and has been rearranged to suit modern requirements.

The 315-acre (127 ha) property also contains a brick tenant house, circa 1790, with two rooms on each of two levels. The house originally featured formal gardens, now largely lost. The property preserves expansive views of Chesapeake Bay and the town of Havre de Grace.

== See also ==
- List of National Historic Landmarks in Maryland
- National Register of Historic Places listings in Harford County, Maryland
