= William Ledyard Rodgers =

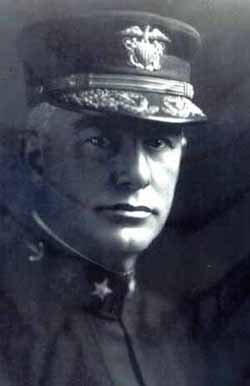
- Born: 4 February 1860; Washington, D.C., U.S.
- Died: 7 May 1944 (aged 84); Bethesda, Maryland, U.S.
- Burial place: Oak Hill Cemetery, Washington, D.C.
- Relatives: John Rodgers (grandfather); John Rodgers (father); John Rodgers (nephew)
- Military career
- Allegiance: United States
- Branch: United States Navy
- Service years: 1878–1924
- Rank: Vice Admiral
- Commands: USS Foote (TB-3); USS Wilmington (PG-8); USS Georgia (BB-15); President of the Naval War College; USS Delaware (BB-28); Training and Service Force, United States Atlantic Fleet; United States Asiatic Fleet; Senior Member, General Board of the United States Navy
- Conflicts: Spanish–American War; Action of 25 April 1898; World War I
- Awards: Navy Cross
- Other work: Military and naval historian and author; President of the Naval Historical Foundation

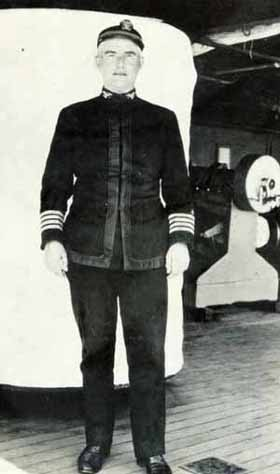
Rodgers photographed as a captain.

William Ledyard Rodgers (February 4, 1860 – May 7, 1944) was a vice admiral of the United States Navy. His career included service in the Spanish–American War and World War I, and a tour as President of the Naval War College. Rodgers was also a noted historian on military and naval topics, particularly relating to ancient naval warfare.

He was the third generation in a well-known family of able naval officers. He was the son of Rear Admiral John Rodgers (1812–1882), who fought in the Second Seminole War (1839–1842) and the American Civil War (1861–1865), and the grandson of Commodore John Rodgers (1772–1838), who fought in the War of 1812 (1812–1814). Rodgers's nephew, John Rodgers, born in 1881, was a pioneering early aviator, reaching the rank of commander before dying in a plane crash in 1926.

== Naval career ==
Born on 4 February 1860 in Washington, D.C., the son of John Rodgers and Ann Elizabeth Hodge Rodgers, William Ledyard Rodgers entered the United States Naval Academy on 11 June 1874 and graduated in 1878. He served aboard the steamer USS Pensacola from 1878 to 1879 and at the United States Naval Observatory in Washington, D.C., from 1880 to 1881, and was promoted to midshipman on 4 June 1880. He served aboard the corvette USS Quinnebaug on the European Station from 1881 to 1884 and was promoted to ensign on 1 April 1882.

Rodgers was on special duty at the United States Department of the Navy in Washington, D.C., from 1884 to 1885, then received instruction in torpedo service during 1886. He was assigned to the Office of Naval Intelligence from 1886 to 1888, then to special duty aboard the protected cruiser USS Atlanta from 1889 to 1892, being promoted to lieutenant, junior grade, on 4 May 1889 while aboard Atlanta. From December 1892 until 1895, he served at the Washington Navy Yard in Washington, D.C., and was promoted to lieutenant in February 1894. In October 1895, Rodgers reported for duty aboard the screw gunboat USS Alliance, which operated as a training ship during his tour. Leaving Alliance, he was assigned in May 1897 to the Columbian Iron Works and Dry Dock Company, which was engaged in ship construction for the U.S. Navy in Baltimore, Maryland.

In January 1898, Rodgers took command of the torpedo boat USS Foote, leading her into combat when the Spanish–American War broke out in April 1898. Foote assisted in the blockade of Cuba, patrolling the coast closely, and fought the first battle of the war on 23 or 25 April 1898 (sources vary), when she approached the harbor at Cárdenas, Cuba, to scout shipping and exchanged fire with the Spanish Navy gunboat Ligera. Spanish sources claim that Foote was badly damaged and forced to withdraw, but U.S. sources state that she simply withdrew. Foote also bombarded Morro Island on 29 April 1898, and during the summer carried mail, dispatches, and supplies from Key West, Florida, to the blockading squadron off Cuba until the end of the war in August 1898.

Rodgers returned to duty at the Washington Navy Yard on 3 November 1898. On 15 May 1900, he reported aboard the screw sloop-of-war USS Lancaster, which was in service with the Training Squadron, and was aboard her until 1901, being promoted to lieutenant commander on 19 February 1901. He was assigned to the battleship USS Kentucky before moving on to a tour on the Naval War College staff at Newport, Rhode Island. After that, he was executive officer of the battleship USS Wisconsin in the United States Asiatic Fleet before becoming commanding officer of the Asiatic Fleet gunboat USS Wilmington in 1906.

Relinquishing command of Wilmington, Rodgers attended the United States Army War College in Carlisle, Pennsylvania, in 1907–1908. While there, he learned about the "applicability system" or "estimate of the situation," requiring that war planning be developed through a four-step process involving "statement of mission, assessment of enemy forces and intentions, assessment of own forces, and evaluation of possible courses of action." He suggested to Raymond P. Rodgers, who served as President of the Naval War College from 1909 to 1911, that the Navy adopt a similar approach. Raymond P. Rodgers introduced it into war planning at the college during his presidency, and it has remained a part of Navy war planning ever since.

In 1909, William Ledyard Rodgers assumed command of the battleship USS Georgia. He then relieved Raymond P. Rodgers as President of the Naval War College on 20 November 1911, serving as president until 15 December 1913. He next took command of the new battleship USS Delaware, then in 1915 became a member of the General Board of the United States Navy in Washington, D.C.

In 1916, Rodgers was promoted to rear admiral and given command of the United States Atlantic Fleet's Training and Service Force, the command he continued to hold after the United States entered World War I in April 1917. In this capacity, he oversaw the training of Atlantic Fleet personnel and the repair and replenishment of its ships through the end of the war in November 1918, using first the repair ship USS Vestal and later the store ship USS Supply as his flagship. He received the Navy Cross for superior performance in this position.

In December 1918, Rodgers was promoted to vice admiral and on 7 December 1918 he took command of the United States Asiatic Fleet, a position he held until 1 September 1919. In 1920, he returned to the U.S. Navy's General Board in Washington, D.C., to serve as its Senior Member, the position he held until his retirement in 1924. During this tour, he also served on the Advisory Commission to the Conference on the Limitation of Armaments in 1921–1922, and as a technical adviser to the Committee of Jurists on the Laws of War at The Hague in the Netherlands in 1923.

== Military and naval historian and author ==
Rodgers had a lifelong love of military and naval history. Throughout his life, he consistently showed an interest in actual hands-on testing and physical examination of history. He wrote many articles on various historical subjects, such as the rate of fire of the Welsh longbow, which were published in various military journals and magazines of the time, and in 1907 published a book titled A Study of Attacks Upon Fortified Harbors (Artillery Notes), published by Artillery School Press.

In retirement, Rodgers continued to pursue his passion for military and naval history. He wrote the introduction to Captain Dudley W. Knox's classic A History of the United States Navy, published in 1936. He served as president of the Naval Historical Foundation from 1927 to 1943, and donated much of his father's book collection as well as volumes of his own collection to the United States Department of the Navy.

Rodgers' most enduring legacy are two classic works on naval warfare he wrote in retirement, titled Greek and Roman Naval Warfare: A Study of Strategy, Tactics and Ship Design from Salamis (480 B.C.) to Actium, published in 1937, and Naval Warfare Under Oars, 4th to 16th Centuries: A Study of Strategy, Tactics and Ship Design, published in 1939. While the former work focuses on the ancient Greek and Roman world of the Mediterranean Sea, the latter work also contains chapters on such rare topics as Viking and medieval naval warfare. Rodgers was primarily a military historian who described battles and tactics, but his works also derive principles of naval warfare in the ancient and medieval worlds, and contain some detailed descriptions of archaeological finds and commentary on the limitations of materials and the design of ancient and medieval naval vessels.

== Death ==
Rodgers died at the National Naval Medical Center in Bethesda, Maryland, on 7 May 1944, at the age of 84. He is buried at Oak Hill Cemetery in the Georgetown section of Washington, D.C.

== Awards ==
- Navy Cross
- Spanish Campaign Medal
- Victory Medal

== Notes ==
Military offices
Preceded by Raymond Perry Rodgers	President of the Naval War College; 20 November 1911 – 15 December 1913	Succeeded by Austin Melvin Knight
Preceded by Austin Melvin Knight	Commander-in-Chief, U.S. Asiatic Fleet; 7 December 1918 – 1 September 1919	Succeeded by Albert Gleaves
