= Action of 22 June 1803 =

Naval battle between USA and Tripolitan

Coordinates: 32°54′8″N 13°11′9″E

- Part of First Barbary War
Date	22 June 1803
Location	Near Tripoli (present day Libya)
Result	American victory

Belligerents
United States	Eyalet of Tripolitania

Commanders and leaders
John Rodgers	Unknown

Strength
1 frigate 1 schooner	1 polacre 9 gunboats

Casualties and losses
Unknown	1 polacre sunk

The action of 22 June 1803 was a naval battle between the United States Navy and the Tripolitan Navy during the First Barbary War. Two ships from the American squadron blockading Tripoli, USS John Adams and USS Enterprise, met and engaged a Tripolitan polacre along with nine gunboats. After fighting a sharp action for forty-five minutes, the gunboats veered off, and the polacre was abandoned. The Tripolitians later retook the polacre and were reengaged by the Americans before the vessel was destroyed in a large explosion.

The destruction of the Tripolitan polacre was a great victory for the American navy. Unfortunately for the Americans, this victory convinced the US commodore, Richard Valentine Morris, that the blockade of Tripoli was no longer needed, and four days later, he raised the blockade headed towards Malta, allowing the Tripolitans to regroup and attack US merchant ships. His action angered the US president, Thomas Jefferson, and removed him from his command.
