= USS Rodgers =

USS Rodgers may refer to the following ships of the United States Navy:

- USS Rodgers (1879) was a steam whaler launched in 1879 as Mary and Helen. She was purchased by the Navy in 1881 and was lost in an accidental fire later that same year.
- USS Rodgers (TB-4) was a Foote-class torpedo boat commissioned in 1898 and decommissioned in 1919.
- USS Rodgers (DD-254) was a Clemson-class destroyer commissioned in 1919 and transferred to the Royal Navy as HMS Sherwood in 1940.

== See also ==
- USS Rogers (DD-876)
- USS John Rodgers
