= John Rodgers (naval officer, born 1772) =

United States Navy officer (1772–1838)

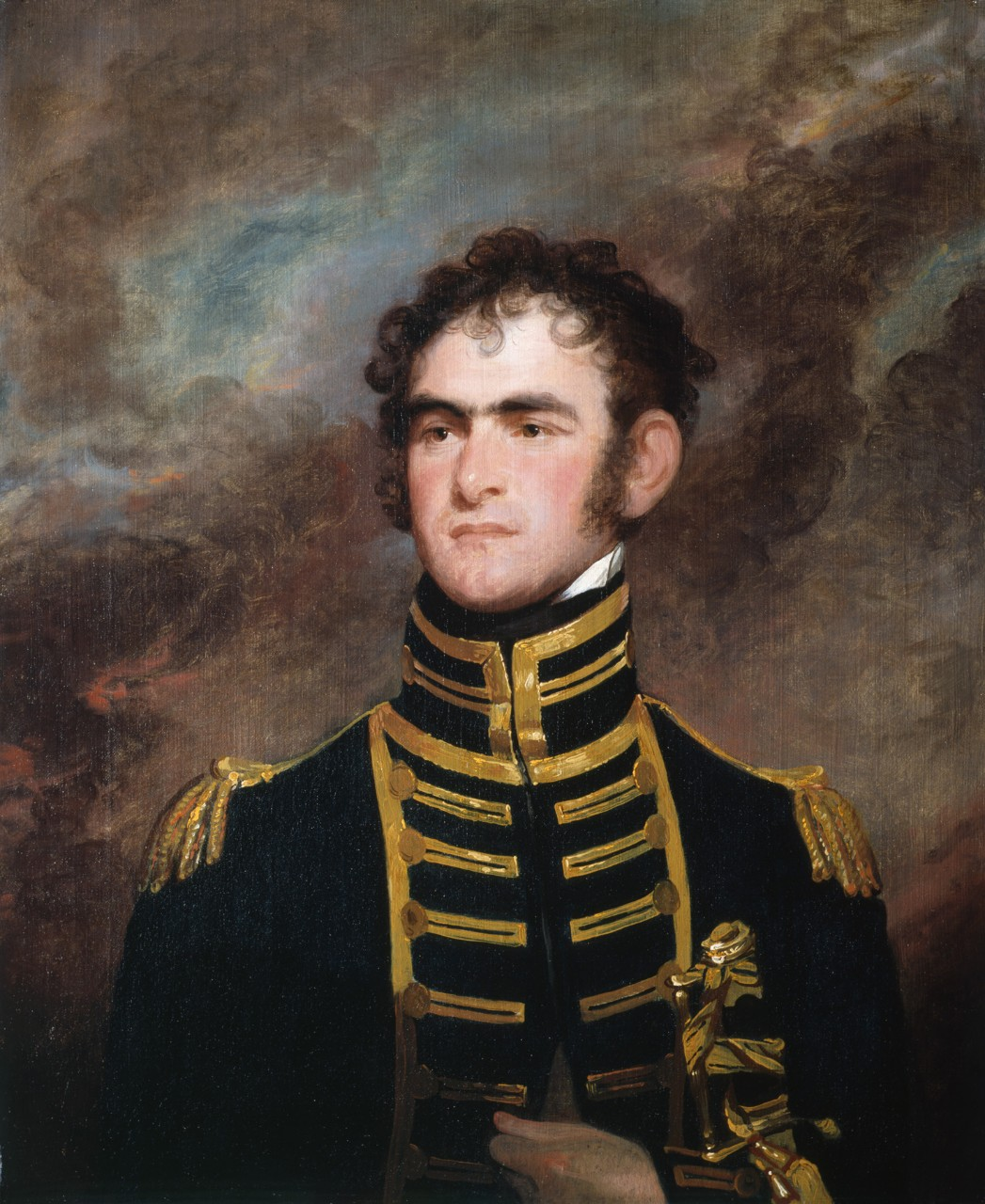
- Portrait by Gilbert Stuart, c. 1810
- Born: July 11, 1772; Perryville, Maryland, British America
- Died: August 1, 1838 (aged 66); Philadelphia, Pennsylvania, U.S.
- Children: John
- Relatives: William Ledyard Rodgers (grandson); George Washington Rodgers (nephew); Christopher Raymond Perry Rodgers (grandson); John Rodgers (great-grandson)
- Military career
- Allegiance: United States
- Branch: United States Navy
- Service years: 1798–1837
- Rank: Commodore
- Commands: USS John Adams; USS President; USS Constitution; USS Insurgent; USS Maryland; USS Guerriere; United States Mediterranean Squadron
- Conflicts: Quasi-War; Action of 9 February 1799; First Barbary War; Action of 22 June 1803; Little Belt affair; War of 1812; Bombardment of Fort McHenry; Battle of Baltimore; "Rogers Bastion" Hampstead Hill; Aegean Campaign

Commodore John Rodgers (July 11, 1772 – August 1, 1838) was a United States Navy officer who served during the Navy's formative years from the 1790s through to the late 1830s. He served under six presidents and for nearly four decades. His service took him through numerous military engagements of the Quasi-War, both Barbary Wars, and the War of 1812.

As a senior officer in the young American navy, Rodgers played a major role in the development of the standards, customs and traditions that emerged during this time. Rodgers was, among other things, noted for commanding the largest American squadron in his day to sail the Mediterranean Sea. After serving with distinction as a lieutenant, he was soon promoted directly to the rank of captain (the rank of Master Commandant did not exist at that time). During his naval career he commanded a number of warships, including USS John Adams, the flagship of the fleet that defeated the Barbary states of North Africa.

During the War of 1812, Rodgers fired the first shot of the war aboard his next flagship, USS President, and also played a leading role in the reoccupation of Washington D.C. after it was occupied by British forces. His own hometown of Havre de Grace, Maryland was raided and burnt during the war. Later in his career he headed the Board of Navy Commissioners, and he served briefly as Secretary of the Navy. Following in his footsteps, Rodgers' son, and several grandsons and great-grandsons, also became commodores and admirals in the United States Navy.

== Early life ==
Rodgers's parents were part of a large wave of Scottish immigrants to the Thirteen Colonies in the years prior to the American Revolution. His father, John Rodgers, was born in Scotland in 1726. He emigrated to America and in 1760 married Elizabeth Reynolds (born 1742) from Delaware, who was also of Scots ancestry. They had eight children, four sons and four daughters; the younger John Rodgers was named for his father. (Note: Rodgers biographer Paullin does not cite the chronological order of the births of these eight children.) Like many other Scots immigrants, his father became a proponent of the patriot cause and served as a colonel in the militia.

Rodgers was born in 1772 on a farm in a village near the "Susquehanna Ferry", on the north shore of the Susquehanna River (near today's Perryville) in Cecil County. This was near its mouth at the Chesapeake Bay. He was raised here for the first thirteen years of his life. While Rodgers was still a youth, the village on the south shore (in Harford County) was named "Havre de Grace" by Marquis de Lafayette after a famous French port of the same name. The young Rodgers was known to fish in the Susquehanna and Chesapeake Bay near his home. He attended local school, and read books about the seafaring life. He had often seen schooner-rigged ships in Havre de Grace but longed to see the large square-rigged vessels he had always read about.

Realizing Rodgers was determined to go to sea, his father helped arrange his apprenticeship with Captain Benjamin Folger, a master ship builder of Baltimore, and Revolutionary War veteran. He had served aboard merchant ships and as commander of Felicity, used in the capture of a privateer. By this time, Folger was captain and owner of Maryland. Rodgers served a five-year apprenticeship on this ship.

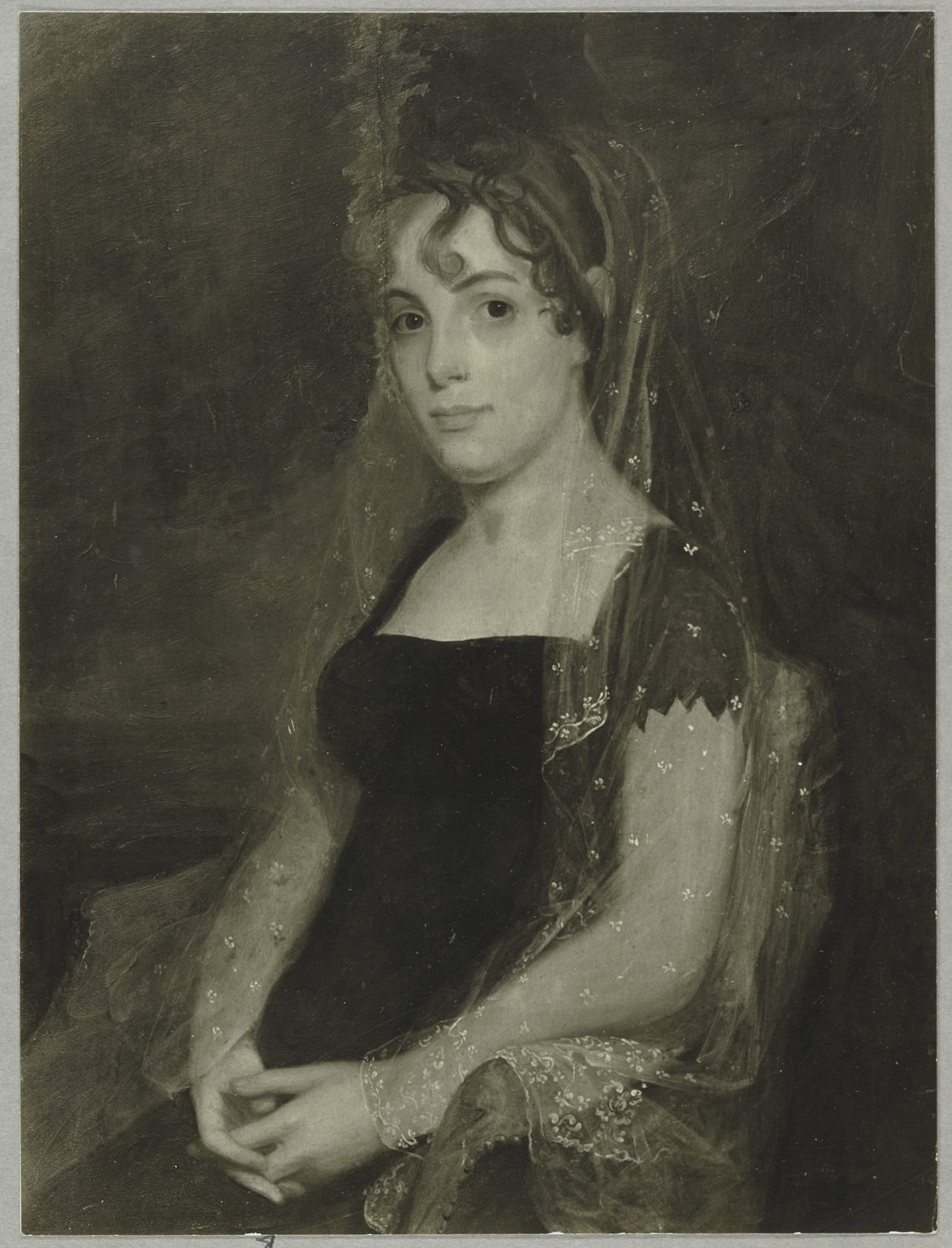
Minerva Denison Rodgers, portrait by John Wesley Jarvis, c. 1806

In 1806 Rodgers married Minerva Denison; they had three sons, Robert, Frederick and John, and two daughters together. (Note: His daughters are not mentioned by name in Paullin's biography of Rodgers.) Their son John Rodgers Jr. was born in Maryland in 1812. He entered the U.S. Navy as a midshipman, serving aboard the Baltimore-built USS Constellation and USS Concord in the Mediterranean Sea. Later he was commissioned as a rear admiral during the Civil War. Rodgers also had several grandsons and great-grandsons who became officers in the U.S. Navy.

=== First command ===
When Rodgers was seventeen, Captain Folger promoted him to first mate of the merchant ship Harmony. By the time Rodgers completed his five years of apprenticeship in 1793, Folger highly recommended him for command of Jane, a merchant ship regularly used in the European trade and owned by Baltimore merchants Samuel and John Smith. Rodgers served as the captain of this ship between four and five years, sailing out of Baltimore for various ports in Europe. His first voyage took him to the Spanish port of Cádiz in the early months of 1793, returning home with a load of salt. Rodgers' next voyage sent him to Hamburg, Germany, but due to severe conditions on the North Sea, he was forced to put up in England for the winter and did not reach his destination until spring of the next year. In September 1795 he departed for Baltimore from Liverpool, arriving after a passage of three months. Logbooks of the Jane during Rodgers's command cover the period of July–August 1796 in detail, a time when France and Great Britain were still at war. (Note: C.O.Paullin gives an excellent representative account of the log entries from Jane during this period in his biography of Rodgers.) During this period, Rodgers mastered the art of ship's command.

Rodgers and his crew were tested under severe conditions on the North Sea. Winds had carried the ship off course, provisions were almost exhausted, and three of his crewmen had frozen to death in one night. Most of the rest despaired of survival. When Rodgers ordered some of the crew to go aloft to secure ice-encrusted rigging, they refused. Outraged, Rodgers stripped off his jacket and shirt and, before going aloft, told the crew to watch what a man could do. While he climbed the frozen rigging bare-chested, the crew immediately rose to his aid. They soon secured the faltering rigging. Given the grim conditions, Rodgers put the matter behind him and days later, they safely reached port.

== Naval career ==
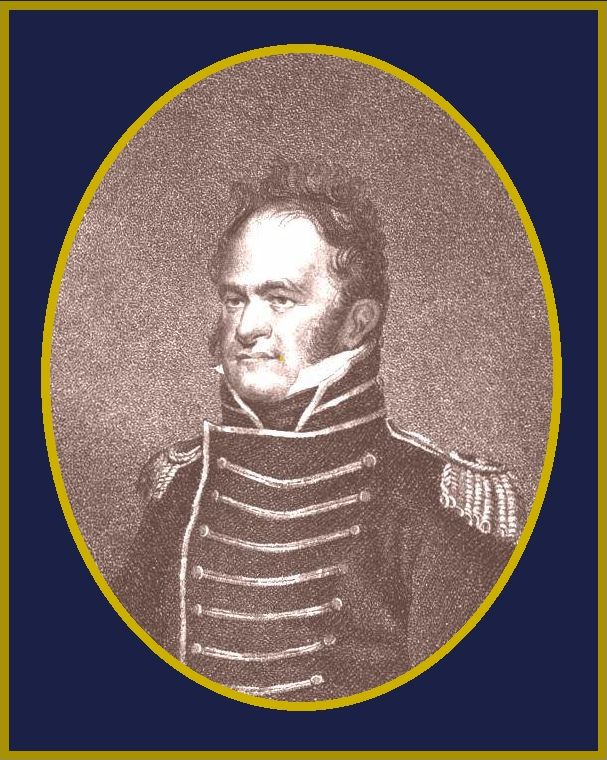
Rodgers portrait in 1798

Rodgers' service in the United States Navy extended through the Quasi War with France, the First Barbary War and the Second Barbary War in North Africa and through the War of 1812. In 1815 he was appointed to the Board of Naval Commissioners, serving through the Second Barbary War until he retired in 1837.

=== Quasi War ===
On March 8, 1798, President John Adams appointed junior officers for the first three ships constructed for the young American Navy; (Note: USS Constellation, USS United States, USS Constitution) Rodgers was appointed second lieutenant of the frigate USS Constellation, under the command of Thomas Truxtun. All of these officers were expeditiously confirmed by the Senate the next day. Rodgers participated in the capture of the French Navy frigate L'Insurgente (Note: Most sources use the French spelling, i.e., L'Insurgente) during Constellation's engagement, and he immediately was made prize master of the surrendered French vessel. Rodgers, along with Midshipman Porter and eleven seamen, boarded the badly damaged L'Insurgente with the challenge of sailing her to a friendly port while also guarding more than 160 prisoners. That evening, gale-force winds separated the two ships, leaving Rodgers, Porter, and the few American seamen aboard the now-renamed Insurgent to save the ship and to control the prisoners without support from the crew of Constellation nearby. To make matters worse, just before surrendering their ship, the crew of L'Insurgente had thrown overboard the gratings to the hold along with handcuffs and other items used to secure prisoners. Greatly outnumbered, Rodgers had seized all weapons and ordered their prisoners to the lower hold, giving orders to open fire with blunderbusses should they try to breach the passageway from their hold. After guarding the prisoners and navigating the captured vessel for two days and three nights through stormy winter weather, Rodgers arrived at Bassettere, the capital of the British colony of Saint Kitts, on February 13, 1799. Great Britain and France were still at war, so the inhabitants of Bassettere were pleased to see a captured French vessel arriving in American hands. For the Americans' effort, a British commander in St. Kitts sent Truxtun a letter of congratulations and offered him every service within his command. The two ships were then refitted and supplied while Insurgent received a new crew. On March 5, 1799, Rodgers was promoted to captain and received written orders to take command of the captured ship.

In June 1799, Rodgers relinquished command of Insurgent, then at Norfolk, Virginia, receiving a letter from Secretary of the Navy Benjamin Stoddert ordering him to Baltimore to supervise the outfitting of USS Maryland, a sloop-of-war (Note: a Sloop of war varies considerably from a sloop) bearing 20 guns, and then to take command of that ship. Three months later Maryland was commissioned under Rodgers' command. In March 1801, he delivered to France the ratified Convention of 1800 (Treaty of Mortefontaine), which ended the Quasi-War.

=== First Barbary War ===
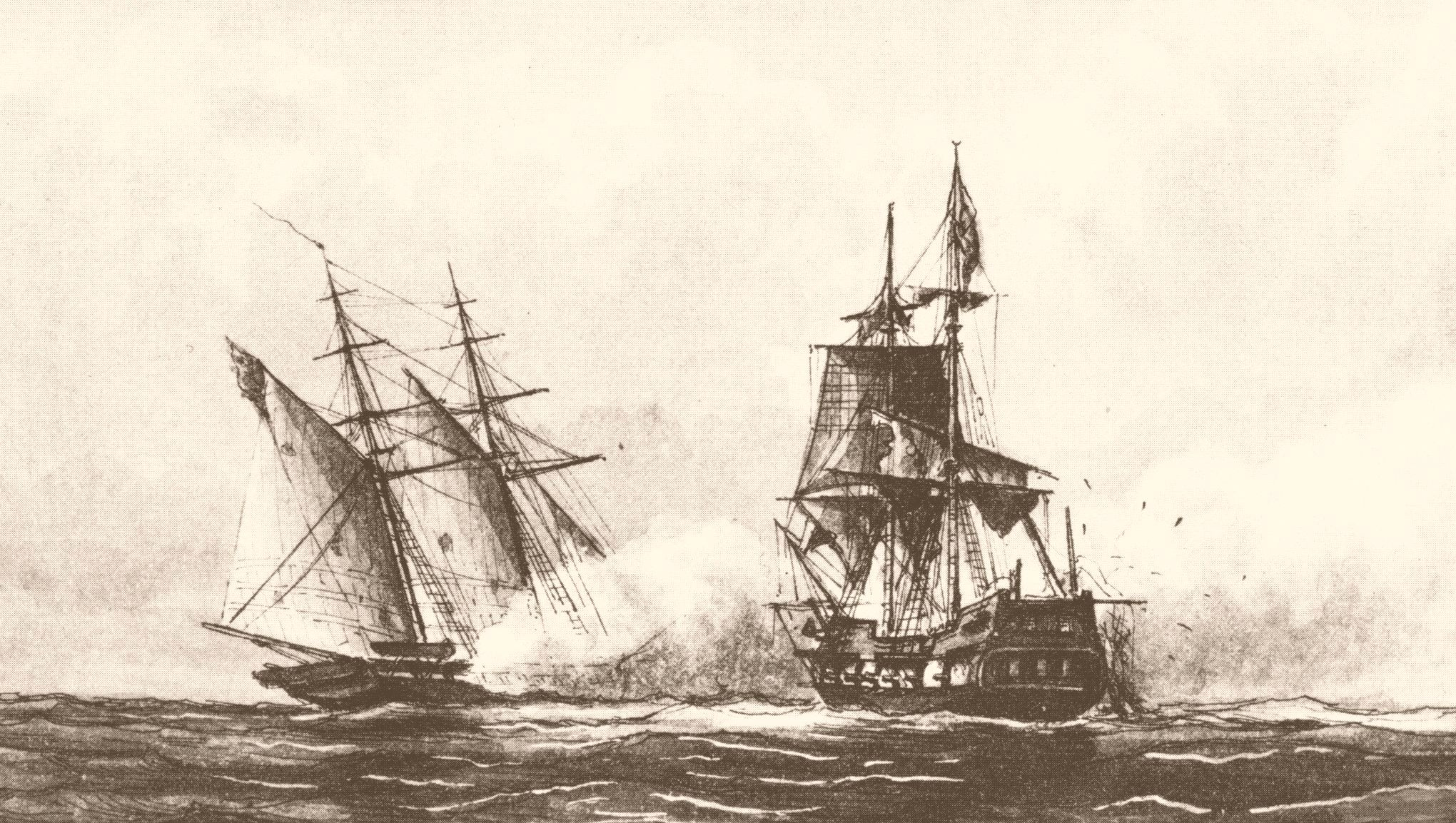
USS Enterprise engaging Tripoli

Placed in command of USS John Adams on May 3 of the following year, Rodgers was ordered to sail for Tripoli to patrol its surrounding waters for three weeks, joining USS Constitution and USS President, along with a number of other vessels. Upon his arrival he immediately approached the harbor fortifications of Tripoli and engaged the gunboats and batteries defending the city. During this time he also pursued and boarded several neutral ships that were attempting to bring grain and other supplies to Tripoli, the inhabitants of which were facing starvation and other difficulties because of the blockade. After twelve days John Adams encountered the Tripolian vessel Meshboha, bearing 20 guns, which Rodgers engaged and captured. The Tripolian vessel previously had been blockaded at Gibraltar and was carrying a load of military supplies to Tripoli. His brilliant record fighting the corsairs won Rodgers appointment as commodore of the Mediterranean Squadron in May 1805. Since Commodore James Barron's health at this time had deteriorated, it was practically impossible for Barron to maintain command of the squadron. Receiving a letter dispatched to him by USS Essex on May 22, Rodgers assumed command of the squadron consisting of the ships Constitution, President, Constellation, Enterprise, Essex, Siren, Argus, Hornet, Vixen, Nautilus, and Franklin, together with a number of gunboats (including No. 5) and bomb vessels. Rodgers was thus in command of the largest American squadron to assemble in the Mediterranean until the twentieth century. The blockading force was so overwhelming that, after much deliberation and appeals from the Dey, a peace treaty with Tripoli was negotiated by the end of July.

When news of the treaty reached Washington D.C. in the fall of 1805, President Thomas Jefferson ordered all of the ships home with the exception of a frigate and two smaller supporting vessels. Before returning home, Rodgers sailed to Malta and Syracuse to close down military hospitals and settle accounts. He stopped to pay a visit to the Dey of Algiers, who had learned of the US treaty with Tripoli, and extended every courtesy to Rodgers, allowing him to be armed in his presence. In a letter to the Secretary of the Navy, Benjamin Stoddert, Rodgers later wrote "I am the first Christian that has ever been permitted to visit the Dey of Algiers with sidearms...."

=== Other service ===
A year later, Rodgers returned to the United States to take command of the New York Flotilla. After the Embargo Act of 1807 against trade with the British Empire was passed by Congress at the close of 1807, Rodgers commanded operations along the Atlantic coast enforcing its provisions.

=== Torpedo test ===
In 1810 Secretary of the Navy Paul Hamilton instructed Commodore Rodgers to oversee a series of tests or trials of inventor Robert Fulton's new naval torpedo. Fulton had recently published Torpedo War, and Submarine Explosions, in which he argued that his newly developed torpedo was practical, and cost efficient, and would soon make most naval vessels obsolete. Presidents Thomas Jefferson and James Madison were intrigued by Fulton's idea and the US Congress authorized $5,000 to test the new weapon. Rodgers thought Fulton's torpedo was a folly. Secretary Hamilton directed Rodgers to prepare "a plan of opposition." In reply, Rodgers promised Hamilton he "would not only prevent the application of any torpedoes which he has yet invented, but any which he will ever be able to invent…"

On September 24, 1810, several thousand residents of New York City gathered on the banks of Corlear's Hook overlooking the East River to watch the widely publicized demonstration of a mock torpedo attack against the brig USS Argus, commanded by Lieutenant James Lawrence. Fulton, the successful inventor of the first commercially viable steamboat, Clermont, and the first practical submarine, Nautilus, was confident that his torpedo could sink a large naval vessel. Rodgers and Lt. Lawrence quickly demonstrated that Fulton's torpedo was unable to penetrate the ship's defense. Fulton in a final report to Hamilton reluctantly conceded he could not penetrate Rodgers' defense. While Rodgers was vindicated, the two men held no rancor toward each other. During the War of 1812 Fulton wrote Rodgers on September 14, 1814, to offer his service in defense of the port of Baltimore; before the letter arrived, the battle was over.

At the outbreak of the War of 1812, the American navy was not prepared to deal with Britain's large and formidable navy, which consisted of hundreds of ships and seasoned commanders and crews, many of whom were already battle hardened by the French Revolutionary and Napoleonic Wars. In 1811, Rodgers was commodore of USS President off Annapolis when he heard that an American sailor had been impressed by HMS Guerriere off Sandy Hook, New Jersey. Rodgers was ordered to sea to "protect American commerce", but he may have had verbal instructions to retaliate for the Royal Navy's impressment of alleged British deserters from American vessels, which was causing much ill-feeling.

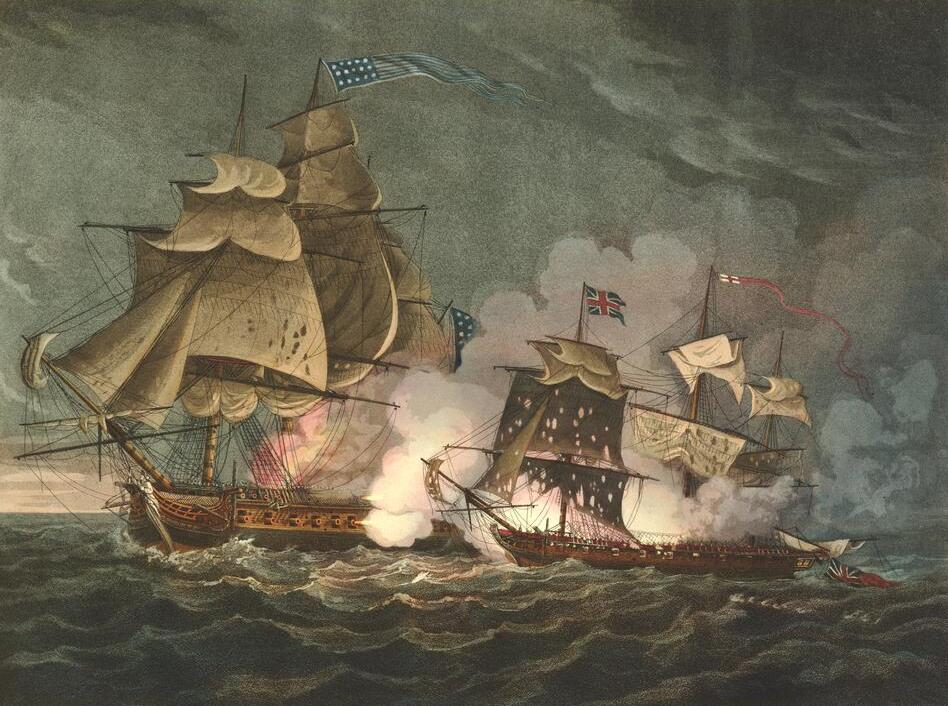
USS President engaging HMS Little Belt

Early in 1811, Secretary of the Navy Hamilton had ordered USS President and USS Argus on patrol duty along the Atlantic coast from the Carolinas to New York. Rodgers was in command of the frigate President off the coast of North Carolina. On May 16, 1811, he sighted and followed the British sloop Little Belt, commanded by Arthur Bingham, thinking it to be HMS Guerriere. Very different versions of events were given on either side. A gun was fired, with each side accusing the other of the first shot. Rodgers continued to engage the much smaller vessel and the President, bearing 44 guns, cut to pieces Little Belt, with only 20 guns. Little Belt lost 13 men killed, including a midshipman and a lieutenant, and 19 wounded, while President incurred only one wounded. The incident came to be known as the Little Belt affair. It was one among many incidents between the United States and Britain that led to the War of 1812.

=== War of 1812 ===
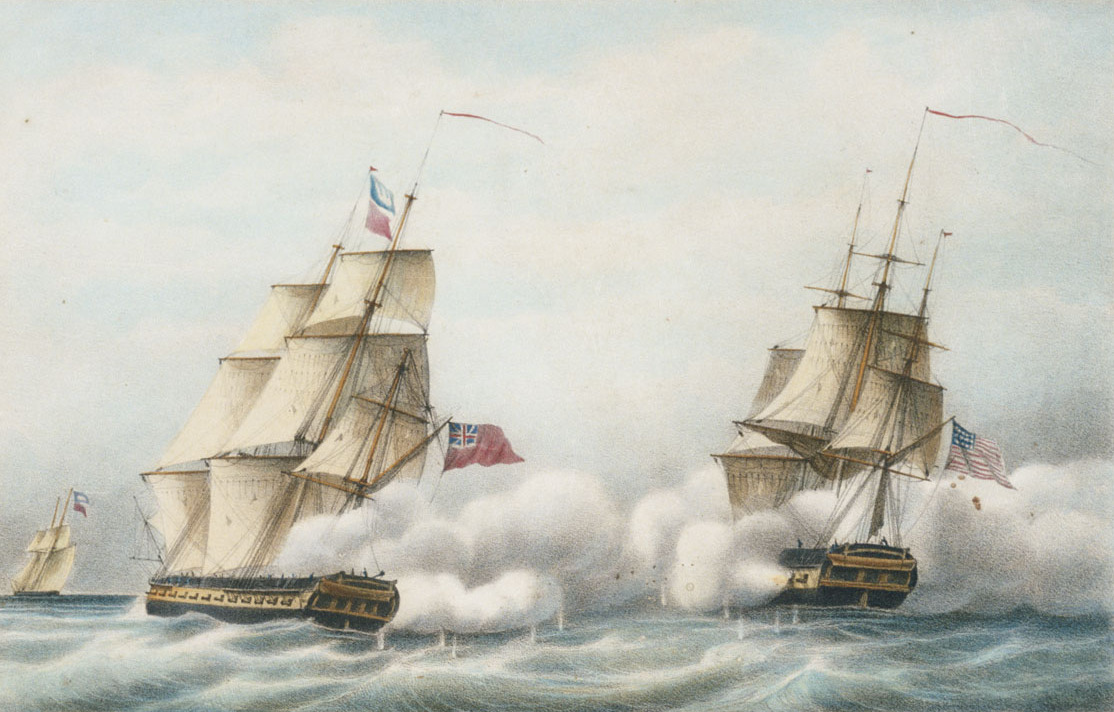
USS President engaging HMS Belvidera on 23 August 1812

When the United States declared war against the United Kingdom on June 18, 1812, many American ships lacked crews and were in need of repairs, while others were still away at sea. The only ships available for service at this time were berthed at New York, under the command of Commodore John Rodgers. These were Rodgers' own flagship, President, along with United States, commanded by Commodore Stephen Decatur, Congress, commanded by Captain Smith, (Note: Not to be confused with Captain John Smith the explorer, born in 1580. Currently (Oct. 2011) there is no page/link for the Smith who served in the War of 1812, hence this note.) Hornet, commanded by Captain Lawrence, and Argus, commanded by Lieutenant Sinclair. However, British warships in American waters at this time were relatively few in number and not themselves very representative of the overall might of the Royal Navy.

Fearing that Congress might consider confining all American ships to port, as soon as Rodgers received news of the June declaration of war, he departed New York Harbor with his squadron within the hour. In anticipation of the war, Rodgers had already had his squadron fitted and ready to embark on the high seas. Their first objective was a British fleet reported to have recently departed from the West Indies, and Rodgers set a course south-east in search of these ships. President passed Sandy Hook on June 21. In the early morning of June 23, a ship was spotted on the horizon to the north-east, which turned out to be the frigate HMS Belvidera, commanded by Captain Richard Byron. Rodgers immediately gave chase, with Congress following close behind. Belvidera had already been informed of the inevitability of war by a passing New York pilot boat and immediately turned about, crowded on all sails and began flight to the north-east with a fresh wind behind all ships coming from the west. (Note: Bearing to north-east is the approximate heading, Roosevelt cites it at north-east by east.)

USS President was an unusually fast frigate and by noon had gained on Belvidera, now some two and a half miles distant, approximately 75 miles south-west of Nantucket island. While President was closing with Belvidera, Captain Byron began clearing the decks and made ready his stern guns. By 4:30 the wind had relaxed some but Belvidera was now close enough to be engaged. Seizing this first possibility, President's forecastle bow chasers fired the first shot of the war, by Rodgers himself, with two more almost immediately following. All three shots struck Belvidera at her stern, striking the rudder assembly and captain's quarters, killing or wounding nine men. (Note: J.F.Cooper's account varies, claiming the shots struck the muzzle of a gun, the stern, killing two, wounding five.) With only a few more shots needed to disable the British vessel, President fired again. But the tide of battle turned when one of its guns burst, killing 16 men, and wounding others, including Rodgers, whose leg was broken. (Note: The young and future Commodore Matthew C. Perry was also aboard and wounded by the burst.) There was a pause of panic about the entire ship, as now every gun was suspected. Byron fired his stern chasers, killing another six men. Belvidera continued to fire, damaging the rigging and foresails. President continued chase, but without adequate foresails, began yawing and losing ground. Belvidera escaped and returned to Halifax, Nova Scotia, carrying the news of the declaration of war.

Rodgers' squadron patrolled the waters off the American upper East Coast until the end of August, 1812. He commanded President for most of the war, capturing 23 prizes, one of the most successful records in the conflict. On land, Rodgers rendered valuable service by transferring his command briefly to Baltimore in September 1814. During the Battle of Baltimore, he defended the city's east side extensive dug-in fortifications, devised by the Maryland Militia's state commander, Major General Samuel Smith on Loudenschlager's Hill (today's Hampstead Hill in western Patterson Park). This was known as "Rodgers' Bastion", one of several that held some of the nearly 100 pieces of artillery with 20,000 American troops that Smith had amassed to face the British. He had already sent down the southeastern "Patapsco Neck" peninsula, Brigadier General John Stricker's regiments of the City Brigade at the Battle of North Point. Rodgers helped defend against the simultaneous British naval attack on Fort McHenry protecting the harbor, and when Washington was invaded and occupied, the month before after the Battle of Bladensburg.

Rodgers' home town of Havre de Grace was raided by British forces led by George Cockburn in 1813. Cockburn's men sacked and burned Rodgers's home, (Note: Cockburn (pronounced as 'Co-burn'), was under the command of Admiral Warren) while Rodgers's mother, wife, and two sisters fled to a friend's house near Havre de Grace. British forces eventually reached this house, too and were under orders to burn it and others in the area. Rodgers' sister, Mrs. Goldsborough, pleaded with the officer in charge of the detail, begging him to prevent the burning of their house for the sake of their aging mother. The officer maintained that he was under strict orders and would have to obtain the consent of his commanding officer, whereupon Mrs. Goldsborough returned with the officer to again plead her case. The commanding officer agreed to spare the house, but by the time they had returned, it had already been set ablaze. However, the fire had not yet taken hold and upon hearing the news that the house was to be spared, the British saved the house from complete ruin.

In April 1814, Rodgers returned to Havre de Grace, where he received orders to take command of Guerriere at Philadelphia, bearing 53 guns. Early in May of that year, he had replaced Commodore Alexander Murray, as commander of the Delaware squadron. Rodgers ordered Lieutenant Charles Morgan to take charge of the squadron to reorganize it, instructing him about outfitting the ships with armament and drilling the crew. On June 20, 1814, Guerriere was launched with a crew of 200 men, while more than 50,000 spectators gathered on the shores of the Delaware River and in small boats to witness this. During that summer Rodgers spent most of his time at Philadelphia's naval yard outfitting this ship. The Delaware squadron comprised some 20 gunboats, sloops and galleys, and was one among several fleets assigned to patrol the chief ports along the upper Atlantic coastline.

=== Burning of Washington ===
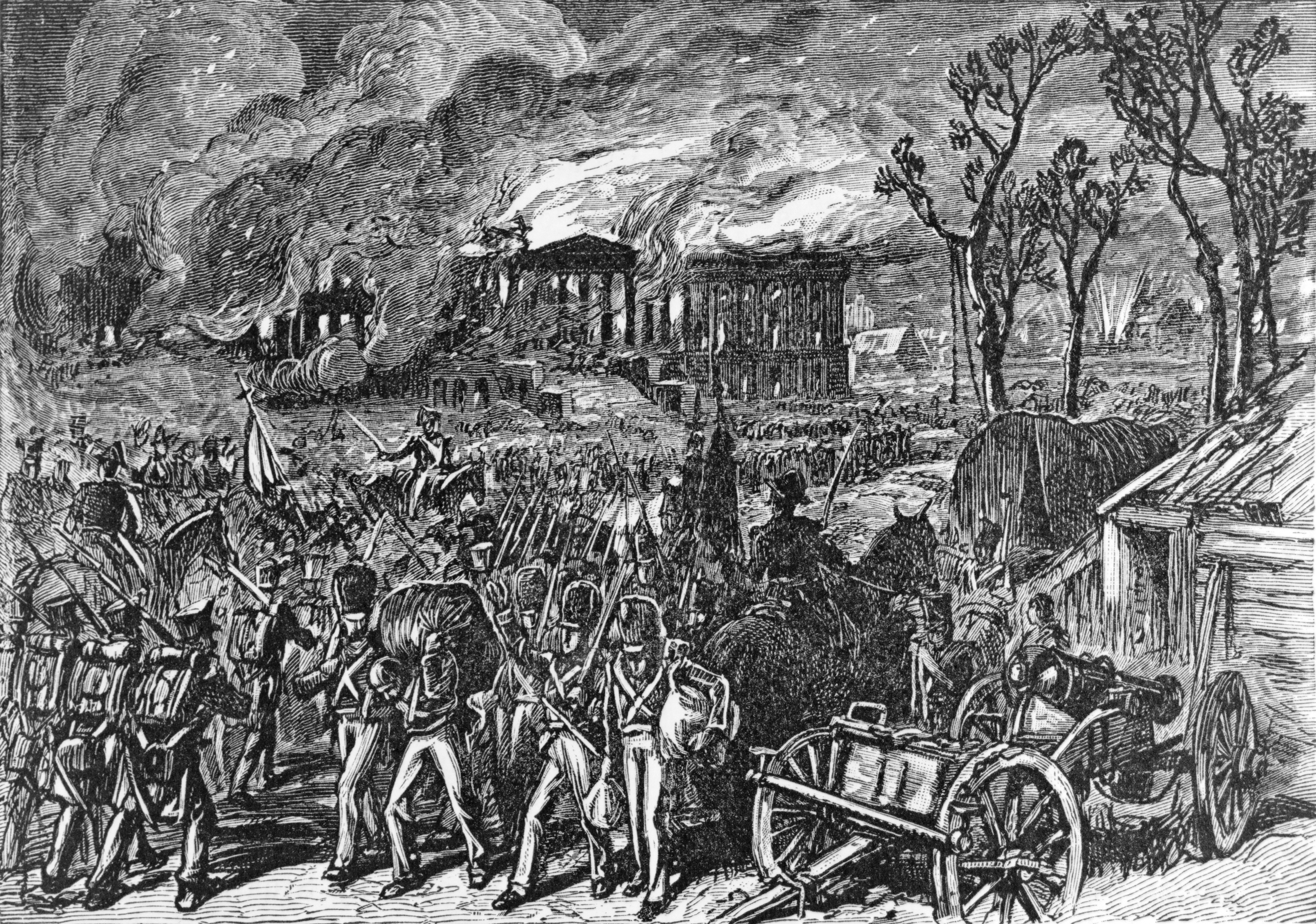
An illustration of the burning of Washington in 1814

Commodore John Rodgers played a major role in the reoccupation of Washington after it had been captured by British in 1814. As a naval officer he was generally unfamiliar with the tactics and deployments of land battle, yet he restored order after the occupation of Washington and he coordinated orders from Secretary of the Navy William Jones for the employment of marines and sailors as naval infantry. Along with ground forces under his two principal subordinates, Commodore Oliver Hazard Perry and Commodore David Porter, Rodgers' flotilla of ships on the Potomac River forced the British to retreat.

In the summer of 1814, American naval forces in the Chesapeake Bay consisted mainly of a fleet of gunboats under the command of Commodore Joshua Barney, a veteran of the American Revolution. On August 20, a British fleet commanded by Cockburn sailed up the Patuxent River searching for Barney's flotilla while British troops marched in the same direction along its shore. Secretary of the Navy Jones responded by ordering Commodore Rodgers in Philadelphia and Commodore Porter in New York to proceed towards Washington with several detachments of sailors and marines. The orders were dispatched by mail but did not reach Philadelphia until ten o'clock the morning of the 22nd. As Rodgers was at Reedy Island on the Delaware River inspecting his flotilla he did not receive the Secretary's orders until he returned at eleven o'clock that evening—-thirteen hours later. Upon receiving the dispatch Rodgers immediately made preparations to march towards Baltimore. Secretary Jones, not knowing that his initial orders had reached Rodgers later than he had anticipated, expected Rodgers to be at his designated station by the evening of the 23rd, and had sent him follow up orders that morning directing Rodgers to Bladensburg, Maryland, five miles (8.0 km) north-east of Washington. Consequently, Rodgers did not receive his orders until it was too late to execute them.

By August 24, Admiral Cockburn's forces had already moved up the Patuxent, forcing Barney to abandon and burn his flotilla. With the area secured, Cockburn's forces advanced on Washington. That afternoon they defeated American troops under General William Winder and Commodore Barney at Bladensburg; by 8 o'clock that evening British troops entered Washington. Within twenty four hours, under the direct supervision of Admiral Cockburn, the British force set fire to the Capitol building, the White House, and other government structures. With American forces defeated and in retreat, President James Madison and Secretary Jones had fled the capital and made their way up the Potomac River to remain in hiding in the countryside. Rodgers proceeded to Baltimore, arriving on the 25th. The citizens there were in a panic fearing their city would suffer the same fate as had just befallen Washington. In the panic the Americans burned Columbia and Argus which were nearby, ready for service. Upon Rodgers' arrival he immediately took up preparing defensive measures about the area, the actions of which restored order among the citizenry; with the inhabitants' courage somewhat restored, Rodgers combined his command with that of Porter's and secured a small flotilla on the Patapsco River, which flows south-east into Chesapeake Bay at Baltimore. With a force of some thousand sailors and marines Rodgers set up defenses about Baltimore, dividing this force into two regiments, one under the command of Porter, the other under the command of Oliver Hazard Perry, who already had been stationed in Baltimore.

In the meantime, President Madison and Secretary Jones returned to Washington, but by August 27 British naval forces under the command of Captain James Gordon advanced on the capital a second time, making their approach by way of the Potomac River with two frigates and a number of smaller vessels reaching Fort Washington, twelve miles down river from the capital. The fort was abandoned when fired upon; the American forces retreated to Alexandria, five miles up river, just seven miles (11 km) outside of Washington. On August 29, Gordon advanced on and captured this town and port, seizing supplies which were then loaded aboard the invading vessels. Upon receiving orders to join Admiral Cockburn's squadron to the south, Gordon's flotilla sailed down river but was delayed due to adverse winds near Fort Washington. Fearing the British had further designs on the capital, Secretary Jones again began preparing defensive forces.

On August 29, he sent Rodgers orders to proceed to Bladensburg from Baltimore with 650 seamen and marines. The day before, Rodgers had ordered Porter to Washington; Porter's 100 sailors and a handful of officers arrived on August 30 with the purpose of guarding the capital. The next day Rodgers and Porter together arrived at Bladensburg where Rodgers met with Secretary Jones. As the American forces were regrouped and in strong defensive positions, the British decided to withdraw. The American forces commanded by Porter and Perry began harassing the retreating British while Rodgers was attacking the British fleet with fire ships. Rodgers had previously improvised his fireships at the Washington Navy Yard. On September 3, he proceeded down the Potomac in a Gig closely followed by his fireships and barges, the latter being manned with 60 marines armed with muskets and swords. When they reached Alexandria, Rodgers entered the abandoned town and ordered the American flag hoisted. Other battles followed with the British attempting to mount counteroffensives on the Potomac and at Baltimore, but these were ultimately frustrated largely through the efforts of forces commanded by Rodgers and Porter.

=== Second Barbary War ===
(Forth coming) -->

=== President of the Board of Navy Commissioners, 1815–1824 ===
In 1815, after the War of 1812 had ended, Congress established the Board of Navy Commissioners (BNC). Rodgers was a prolific political writer whose thoughts appealed to President Madison, leading him, with the consent of the Senate, to appoint Rodgers to the Board of Navy Commissioners, along with Isaac Hull and David Porter. Rodgers headed the Board from 1815 through 1824 and again from 1827 until he retired in May 1837. Rodgers also served briefly as Secretary of the Navy in 1823. In February 1815, Commodore John Rodgers was appointed the President of the Board of Navy Commissioners. The law creating the Board gave it authority over procurement of naval stores, supplies and material as these related to the construction of naval vessels, outfitting of ships, armament and equipment plus oversight authority over naval shipyards, stations and dry-docks. The BNC also regulated civilian employment and pay. Serving with Rodgers on the Board were Commodores David Porter and Isaac Hull. The BNC found all current yards to have shortcomings. One of the most important recommendations the BNC made during Rodgers tenure was that only Portsmouth and Boston Navy Yard were suitable for the building of large ships in all seasons. Though the BNC recommended Washington Navy Yard be retained its report noted, "The Yard at Washington, when viewed as building yard only, would be less objectionable [than Baltimore] were the navigation deeper and the obstructions fewer. But it is the decided opinion of the Board, that the obstructions and its distance from the sea render it unsuitable for every other purpose." The Board recommended Baltimore, Norfolk and Charleston navy yards be closed. These recommendations were controversial and became the subject of considerable partisanship, with only Baltimore and Charleston eventually phased out of existence. The BNC final report was in fact, highly critical of the Washington Navy Yard and its business practices. Writing on 11 May 1815 to Commodore Thomas Tingey the BNC stated, "The Board are about contracting for the repairs of the Black Smith shop in the Navy Yard under your command for the purpose of employing workmen to put in order for service & a state of preservation ... It is the intention of the Board of the Navy Commissioners, to reestablish the Navy Yard at this place, as a building Yard only, & while stating to you this intention, it may not be improper for them to make you acquainted with their views generally with respect to the establishment. They have witnessed in many of our Navy Yards & this particularly pressure in the employment of characters unsuited for the public service – maimed & unmanageable slaves for the accommodation of distressed widows & orphans & indigent families - apprentices for the accommodation of their masters – & old men & children for the benefit of their families & parents . These practices must cease – none must be employed but for the advantage of the public, & this Yard instead of rendering the navy odious to the nation from the scenes of want & extravagance which it has too long exhibited must serve as a model on which to prefect a general system of economy. In making to you,- Sir, these remarks the Navy Commissioners are aware that you have with themselves long witnessed the evils of which they complain, & which every countenance will be given to assist you in remedying them, they calculate with confidence on a disposition on your part to forward the public interests." From November 1824 through May 1827, he commanded the Mediterranean Squadron. After his final naval command, returned to New York where he became the Navy agent at the port there.

== Societies ==
During the 1820s, Rodgers was a member of the prestigious Columbian Institute for the Promotion of Arts and Sciences, who counted among their members former presidents Andrew Jackson and John Quincy Adams and many prominent men of the day, including well-known representatives of the military, government service, medical and other professions.

== Final years ==
Several years before Rodgers retired from the Board of Naval Commissioners his health began to decline, it is believed from a case of cholera. On advice that his condition would benefit from a leave of absence he was persuaded to take a trip across the Atlantic to England. Rodgers subsequently resigned his commission with the blessing of President Andrew Jackson and Secretary Mahlon Dickerson of the Navy. On May 10 he sailed for London, embarking from New York on the packet ship Montreal and spent several weeks in London. He also visited the towns of Plymouth and Portsmouth and was escorted and given much attention by the Admiralty and many notable people. He was the guest of two close friends, Admiral Sir James Stirling and Lady Hillyarm who were with the Mediterranean Fleet while Rodgers was serving there, dealing with the piracy of the Barbary states.

Late in August 1837 Rodgers returned to the United States with little improvement in his health. He remained at his home at Lafayette Square in Washington for several weeks, but with his health now steadily declining again he was placed in the care of the naval asylum at Philadelphia under the care of a naval doctor and friend, Dr. Thomas Harris. His wife took up residence in a boarding house nearby. Soon his already frail condition began to rapidly worsen and when it was certain his death was imminent his wife was sent for, but Rodgers had already lapsed into unconsciousness by the time she arrived at his bedside. Rodgers' last words were spoken to his butler and close friend, asking, "...do you know the Lord's Prayer?" His butler replied "yes, master." Rodgers responded, "Then repeat it for me". Rodgers died in the arms of his butler on August 1, 1838, at the age of 66.

Rodgers' funeral took place at the home of Commodore Biddle. In attendance was Brigadier General Prevost, who had called upon the uniformed men in the city to honor Rodgers with a parade through Washington.

Rodgers was buried in the family burial site in the Congressional Cemetery at Washington, his grave marked by a pyramidal shaped sandstone monument which also bears the names of his wife, Minerva Denison, his son Frederick, and two daughters who were also laid to rest there in later years.

== Influence and legacy ==
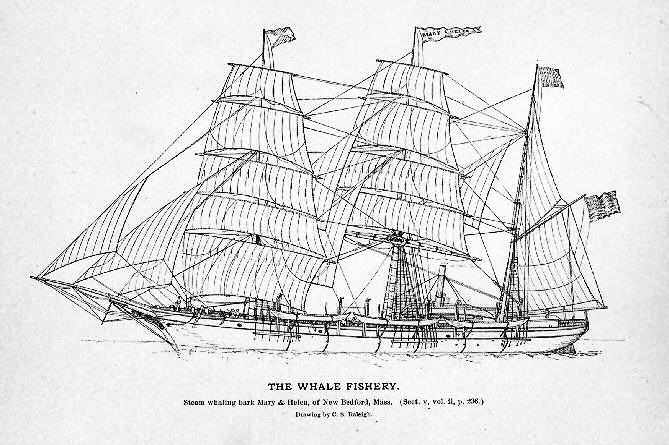
First USS Rodgers

Commodore Rodgers established a naval "dynasty" that produced several other notable officers. His son John Rodgers (1812–1882) served in the American Civil War, and his great-grandson John Rodgers (1881–1926) served in World War I.

Six ships have been named in their honor, three as USS John Rodgers and three as USS Rodgers.

Louisa, daughter of Commodore Rodgers, was married to Union General Montgomery C. Meigs; their son John Rodgers Meigs was killed in the Civil War in 1864. (General Meigs was a great grandson of Continental Army Colonel Return J. Meigs, Sr.).

His home, Sion Hill, was added to the National Register of Historic Places in 1990, and designated a National Historic Landmark in 1992.

== See also ==
- List of United States Navy people
- List of sailing frigates of the United States Navy
- Raid on Havre de Grace
- Chronology of the War of 1812
- Bibliography of early American naval history

== Bibliography ==
- Abbot, WILLIS J. (1890). THE NAVAL HISTORY OF THE UNITED STATES.
  Peter Fenelon Collier, New York. p. 438. Url
- Allen, Gardner Weld (1905). Our Navy and the Barbary Corsairs.
  Houghton Mifflin & Co., Boston, New York and Chicago. p. 354. OCLC 2618279. Url
- Allen, Gardner Weld (1909). Our naval war with France.
  Houghton Mifflin, Boston, New york. p. 323. OCLC 197401914. Url
- Cooper, James Fenimore (1846). Lives of distinguished American naval officers.
  Carey and Hart, Philadelphia. p. 436. OCLC 620356. Url
- —— (1856). History of the Navy of the United States of America.
  Stringer & Townsend, New York. p. 508. OCLC 197401914. Url
- Griffis, William Elliot (1887). Matthew Calbraith Perry: a typical American naval officer.
  Cupples and Hurd, Boston. p. 459. Url
- Hagan, Kenneth J. (1992). This People's Navy: The Making of American Sea Power.
  The Free Press, New York. p. 468. ISBN 0-02-913471-4. Url
- Hickey, Donald R. (1989). The War of 1812, A Forgotten Conflict.
  University of Illinois Press, Chicago and Urbana. ISBN 0-252-01613-0. url-1, url-2
- Johnston, William Dawson (1904). History of the Library of Congress: Volume I, 1800-1864
  Bulletin of the United States National Museum, October 18, 1917.
  Library of Congress, Government Printing Office. Url
- Leiner, Frederic C. (2007). The End of Barbary Terror, America's 1815 War against the Pirates of North Africa. Oxford University Press, 2007. ISBN 978-0-19-532540-9.
- Paullin, Charles Oscar (1910). Commodore John Rodgers: Captain ...
  The Arthur H. Clark Company, Cleveland, Ohio. p. 434. Url
- Roosevelt, Theodore (1883). The naval war of 1812.
  G.P. Putnam's sons, New York. p. 541. Url
- Skaggs, David Curtis (2006). Oliver Hazard Perry: honor, courage, and patriotism in the early U.S. Navy.
  Naval Institute Press. p. 302. ISBN 1-59114-792-1. Url
- Toll, Ian W. (2008). Six frigates: the epic history of the founding of the U.S. Navy.
  W. W. Norton & Company, New York. pp. 592. ISBN 978-0-393-05847-5. Url
- Waldo, Samuel Putnam (1821). The life and character of Stephen Decatur.
  P. B. Goodsell, Hartford, Conn., 1821. Url
