= John Rodgers (naval officer, born 1881) =

American naval officer (1881–1926)

John Augustus Rodgers Jr.
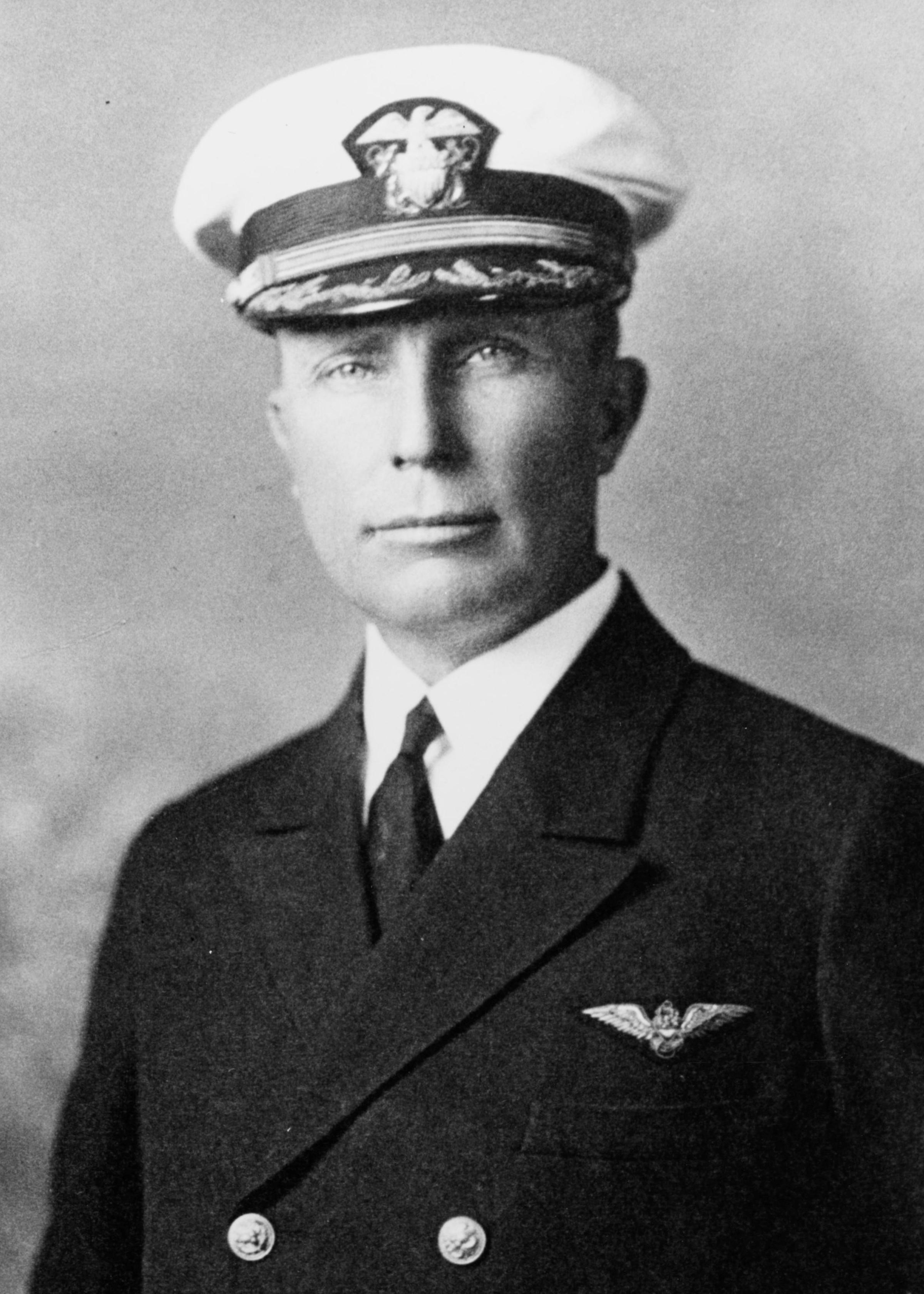
- Rodgers, c. 1920
- Born: January 15, 1881; Washington, D.C., U.S.
- Died: August 27, 1926 (aged 45); Delaware River, U.S.
- Spouse: Ethel R. Grenier
- Children: 1
- Relatives: Matthew C. Perry (great grandfather); John Rodgers (great grandfather); John Rodgers (grandfather); William Ledyard Rodgers (cousin); Calbraith Perry Rodgers (cousin); Frederick Rodgers (uncle)
- Military career
- Allegiance: United States of America
- Branch: United States Navy
- Service years: 1903–1926
- Rank: Commander
- Conflicts: World War I
- Awards: Navy Distinguished Service Medal

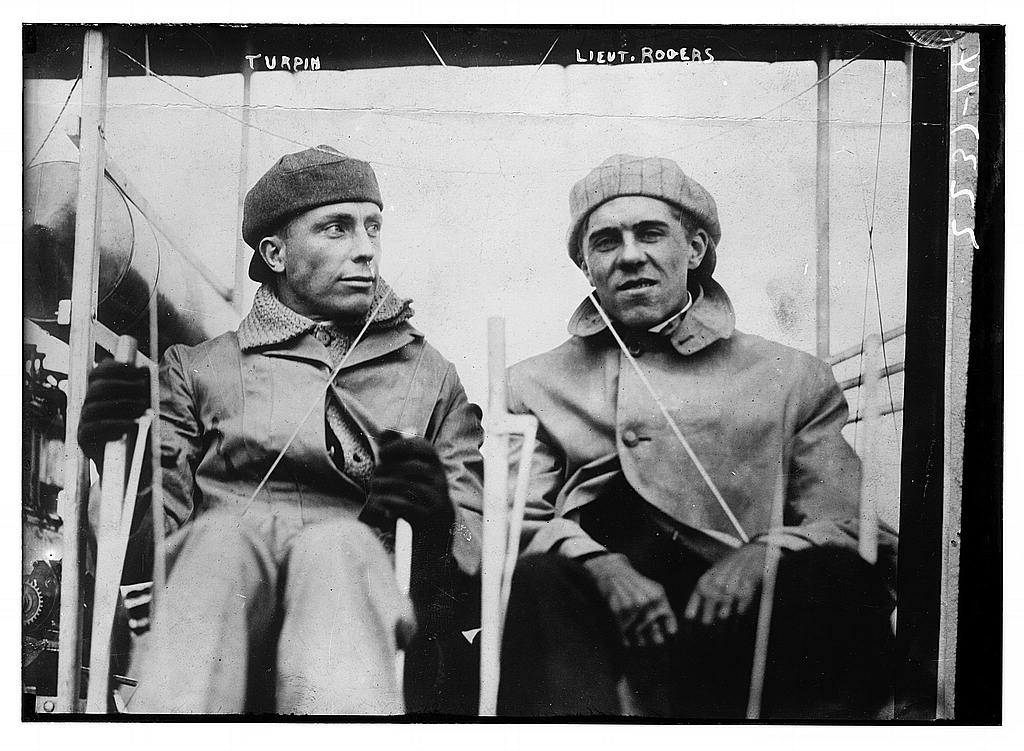
John Rodgers on left and aviator J. Clifford Turpin in 1912. The men are incorrectly labeled on the photograph and Rodgers's name is misspelled.

John Augustus Rodgers Jr. (January 15, 1881 – August 27, 1926) was an officer in the United States Navy and a pioneering aviator.

== Biography ==
Rodgers was the great-grandson of Commodores Rodgers and Perry. He was born in Washington, D.C. and graduated from the Naval Academy in 1903 where he played football and rowed crew. His early naval career included service on ships of various types before studying flying in 1911 and becoming the second American naval officer to fly for the United States Navy, designated as U.S. Naval aviator No. 2.

=== Early aviation career ===
Rodgers learned to fly in San Diego under the instruction of Glenn Curtiss. On February 1, 1911, Rodgers, now a lieutenant, participated in an experiment under the direction of Captain Washington Irving Chambers, the first Navy officer assigned to development of the nascent U.S. Naval aviation program, that involved a man-lifting kite. A train of 11 man-raising kites lifted Rodgers to a record 400 feet off the deck of USS Pennsylvania (ACR-4). This was the same ship on which Eugene Ely performed the first shipboard landing of an airplane days earlier. As the ship steamed along at a 12 kt clip, Rodgers worked against an 8-kt breeze while suspended from a kite cable 100 yards astern. He made observations and took photographs for 15 minutes, signaling his observations back to the ship. Reportedly, he had a clear view for over 40 miles.

On March 17, 1911, Rodgers reported to the Wright Company in Dayton, Ohio, to receive flight training. This was in response to the Wright Brothers offering to train one pilot for the Navy. He was only the second Navy officer to receive such instruction, and the first to receive it from the Wrights.

On July 1, 1911, Rodgers was on a leave of absence from the Navy while the aviation facilities at Greenbury Point on the grounds of the United States Naval Academy were being prepared. He filled this time performing aerial demonstrations in Ohio with his cousin, Calbraith Perry Rodgers. On their way back to Dayton from Springfield, having just finalized a contract to perform at the Fourth of July celebration there, they reportedly borrowed the Wright flyer kept at the Wright brothers' field at Simms, Ohio, without permission. The two made a few successful flights and things were going well, until they damaged a wing on one of the landings. Once informed, the Wright brothers insisted upon the use of the Rodgers plane until theirs was repaired, costing them some business engagements.

The Wright biplane arrived at Greenbury Point on the grounds of the United States Naval Academy on September 6, 1911. Rodgers completed the acceptance flight for it the next day then embarked on a flight from the Naval Academy to Washington, D.C. This was the first time it had ever been attempted. After circling the academy grounds for several turns, he set out on the 45-mile trip to D.C., following the tracks of the Washington, Baltimore, and Annapolis electric line, flanked by his friends following in automobiles. After flying around a thunderstorm near Odenton, Maryland, he overflew the Army aviation camp at College Park, Maryland. He then overflew the Bennings neighborhood in D.C. and commenced down the eastern branch of the Potomac. After passing over the United States Army War College, he turned toward the city at an altitude of 2000 feet. He reached the city at about 4:45 pm then circled the Washington Monument for 15 minutes where he executed several maneuvers before landing near the White House at 5:04 pm in front of a small crowd. At the time, it was one of the longest, most successful flights in Naval Aviation. After exchanging greetings with CAPT Chambers, he flew back to Annapolis.

On September 16, Rodgers became the first man in America to visit his parents by airplane. He departed College Park, Maryland, at 1:15 in the afternoon; passing over the northwestern section of Baltimore, he landed at the Pimlico racetrack, where he refueled. Afterwards, he circled Pimlico for half an hour at various altitudes and was then off to Havre de Grace, arriving at the Rodgers home at Sion Hill at 5:35. His father, Rear Admiral John Augustus Rodgers Sr., his mother, and brother Robert greeted him upon landing in a field 200 yards from their house. Following the tracks of the Pennsylvania Railroad from Baltimore into the city, he landed with less than a quart of fuel. Crowds gathered in along his route of flight to cheer him on. His intention was to leave the next day for New York, where his cousin Calbraith Perry Rodgers was to depart Sheepshead Bay for San Francisco that afternoon to compete for the $50,000 Hearst Prize.

In late November 1911, Rodgers was at the Navy aviation camp at Annapolis developing a life preserver for use in hydroplane flights. The life preserver was described as being "very similar to a baseball catcher's breast protector" and was worn in a similar fashion. Designed to keep a man afloat until help arrived, the waist and neck straps were rubber tubes that were inflated along with the rest of the vest when in use over water.

=== Return to sea ===
He commanded Division 1, Submarine Force, Atlantic Fleet in 1916; and, after the United States entered World War I, he commanded the Submarine Base at New London, Connecticut. Following the war, he served in European waters and received the Navy Distinguished Service Medal for outstanding work on minesweeping operations in the North Sea.

=== First non-stop flight to Hawaii attempt ===
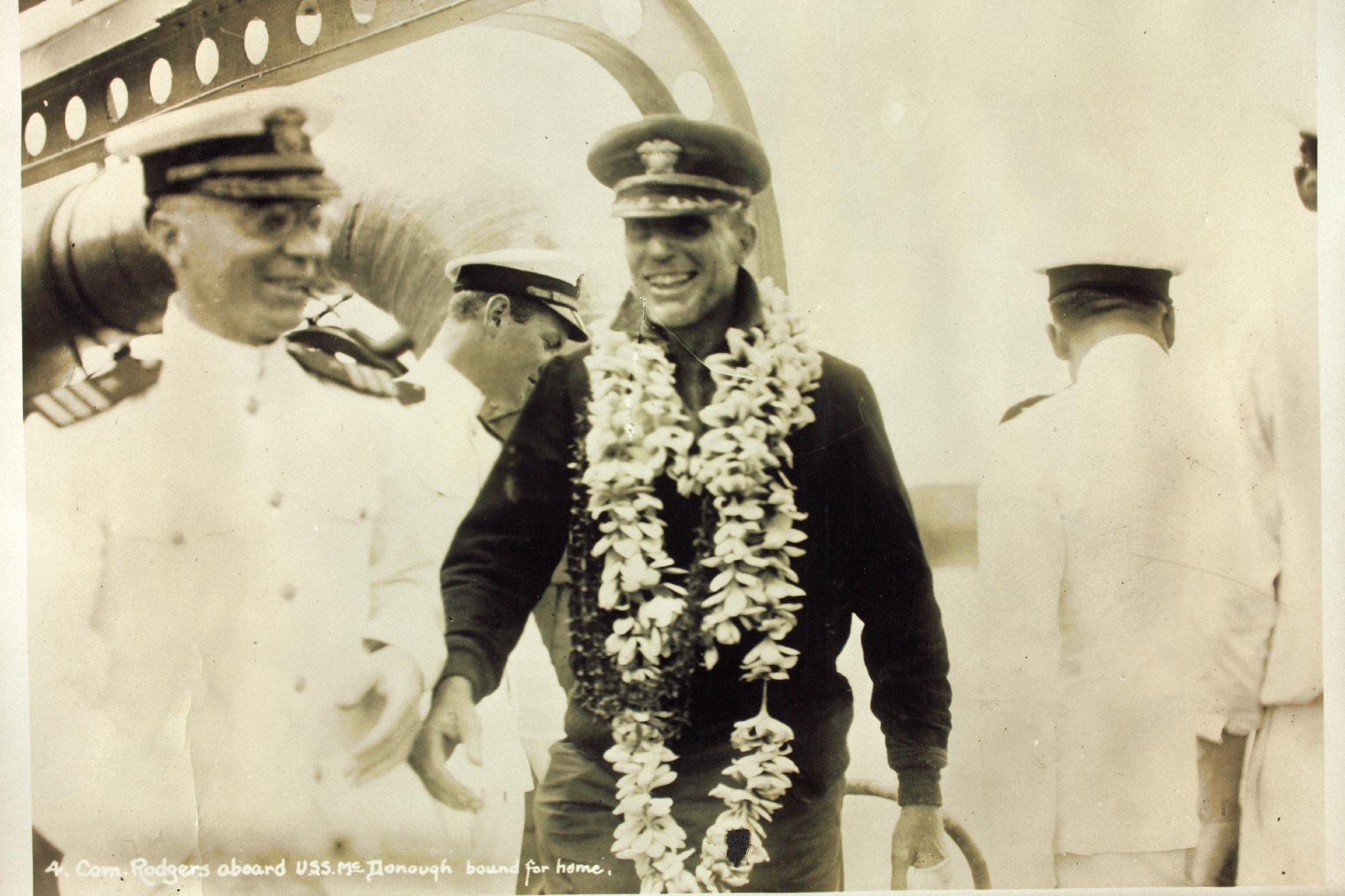
John Rodgers aboard the USS McDonough 1925

After several important assignments during the next five years, he commanded Aircraft Squadrons, Battle Fleet, in Langley in 1925. That year he led the first attempt at a non-stop flight from California to Hawaii. Given the technology of the time, this tested the limits of both aircraft range and the accuracy of aerial navigation. The expedition was to include three planes. Rodgers commanded the flying boat PN-9 No. 1. The PN-9 No. 3 was commanded by Lt. Allen P. Snody. The third plane was to have been a new design, which was not completed in time to join the expedition. Due to the risks, the Navy positioned 10 guard ships spaced 200 miles apart between California and Hawaii to refuel or recover the aircraft if necessary. The two PN-9s departed San Pablo Bay, California (near San Francisco) on August 31. Lt. Snody's plane had an engine failure about five hours into its flight, was forced to land in the ocean, and was safely recovered.

Rodgers's flight proceeded with few difficulties for more than 1,200 miles. However, higher than expected fuel consumption and a weaker than predicted tailwind made it necessary for the plane to land in the ocean and refuel. The plane headed for a refueling ship, but limitations of the navigation technology and erroneous navigation information provided by the ship's crew caused Rodgers and his crew to miss the ship. The flying boat was forced to land in the ocean when it ran out of fuel on September 1. Since the position of the plane was not known while it was in the air and the plane's radio could not transmit when the plane was floating on the water, Rodgers and his crew were not found by an extensive, multi-day search by planes and a large number of ships. After passing a night without rescue, Rodgers and his crew used fabric from a wing to make a sail and sailed towards Hawaii, several hundred miles away. Later the plane's crew used metal flooring to fashion leeboards to improve their ability to steer the flying boat while it was sailing. Finally, nine days later, after sailing the plane 450 miles to within 15 miles of Nawiliwili Bay, Kauai, the plane and its crew were found by submarine USS R-4 under the command of Lt. Donald R. Osborn Jr, (USNA class of 1920), after a search by the US Navy. They were towed near the reef outside of the port. The harbor master and his daughter rowed out to the plane and helped Rodgers and his crew surf over the reef and into the safety of the harbor. By the time they were found by the submarine, Rodgers and his crew had subsisted a week without food and with limited water. He later shared with a newspaper, "We were taken care of by the good people of the island, who insisted on treating us as invalids, whereas as a matter of fact we were in very good shape and perfectly capable of taking care of ourselves." After their return, Rodgers and his crew were treated as heroes. Also, despite not reaching Hawaii by air, their flight established a new non-stop air distance record for seaplanes of 1,992 miles (3,206 km).

After this experience, Rodgers served as assistant chief of the Bureau of Aeronautics until his accidental death in an airplane crash after the plane he was piloting suddenly nose-dived into the Delaware River on August 27, 1926. He is interred at Arlington National Cemetery.

After Rodgers' untimely death, it would be the first time since 1776 that the United States Navy did not count a serving member of the Rodgers family amongst their ranks.

== Legacy ==
Six ships were named in honor of Rodgers, his grandfather, and his great-grandfather, all named either USS Rodgers or USS John Rodgers.

Two airfields on Oahu were named after Rodgers. In 1927, the territory established John Rodgers Airport on the site of what is now Daniel K. Inouye International Airport; the overseas terminal building (now designated Terminal 2) is known as the John Rodgers Terminal. Independently, the U.S. Navy named the airfield at Naval Air Station Barbers Point as John Rodgers Field. With the closure of the naval base in 1999, the airfield was transferred to civilian control and renamed Kalaeloa Airport, with an FAA identification code of JRF to preserve the historical connection.

He was a cousin of pioneer transcontinental pilot Cal Rodgers.

In 2007, a full-length feature screenplay, Hawaii Calls, depicting these historic events was created by Rick Helin, a California screenwriter. As of early 2008, it was in the early pre-production stage.

== See also ==
- John Alcock - British commander of the first non-stop transatlantic flight (1919)
- Theodore G. Ellyson - U.S. Naval Aviator No. 1
- Eugene Burton Ely - First aviator to successfully takeoff and land from a ship
- William A. Moffett - First commander of the U.S. Navy's Bureau of Aeronautics & father of U.S. Naval aviation
- Albert Cushing Read - U.S. commander of the first transatlantic flight (1919)
- John Henry Towers - U.S. Naval Aviator No. 3
