= USS Foote (TB-3) =

Torpedo boat of the United States Navy

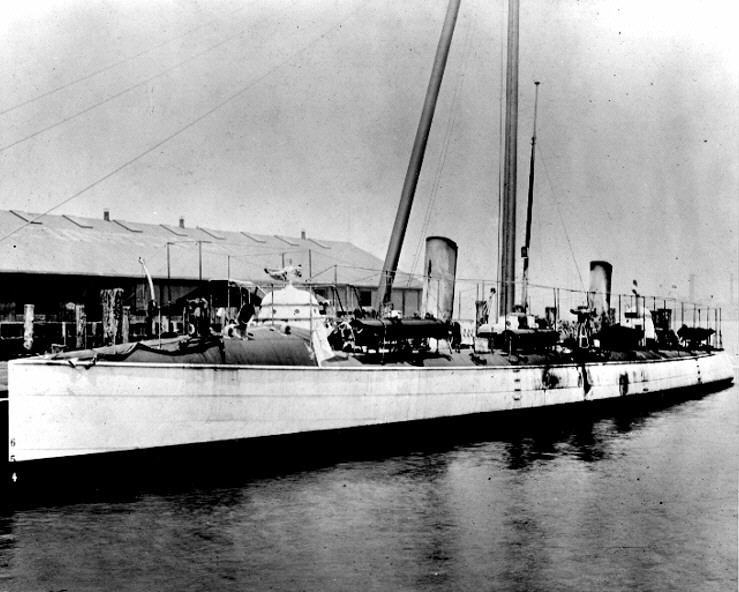
- USS Foote (TB-3), photographed circa 1896-97.

History

United States
- Name: Foote
- Namesake: Rear admiral Andrew Hull Foote
- Ordered: 26 July 1894 (authorised)
- Builder: Columbian Iron Works and Dry Dock Co., Baltimore, MD
- Laid down: 1 May 1896
- Launched: 1 October 1896
- Sponsored by: Miss Laura Price
- Commissioned: 7 August 1897
- Decommissioned: 28 March 1919
- Renamed: Coast Torpedo Boat No. 1, 1 August 1918
- Identification: TB-3
- Fate: Sold, 19 July 1920

General characteristics
- Class & type: Foote-class torpedo boat
- Displacement: 142 long tons (144 t)
- Length: 160 ft (49 m)
- Beam: 16 ft 1 in (4.90 m)
- Draft: 5 ft (1.5 m) (mean)
- Installed power: 2 × Thornycroft boilers; 2,000 ihp (1,500 kW)
- Propulsion: vertical triple expansion engines; 2 × shaft
- Speed: 25 kn (29 mph; 46 km/h); 24.53 kn (28.23 mph; 45.43 km/h) (Speed on Trial)
- Complement: 20 officers and enlisted
- Armament: 3 × 1-pounder (37 mm (1.46 in)) guns; 3 × 18 inch (450 mm) torpedo tubes (3x1)

USS Foote (Torpedo Boat No. 3/TB-3/Coast Torpedo Boat No. 1) was launched 1 October 1896 by Columbian Iron Works and Dry Dock Co., Baltimore, Md.; sponsored by Miss Laura Price; and commissioned 7 August 1897, Lieutenant W. L. Rodgers in command.

After training out of Charleston, S.C., Foote joined the North Atlantic Blockading Squadron at Key West, Fla., 19 March 1898. In the subsequent Spanish–American War she served as picket, patrolled, and carried orders from the flagship to ships of the squadron, and from 23 April, patrolled the Cuban coast closely, primarily off the Cardenas entrance to Havana Harbor. On that day, she penetrated the harbor to scout shipping, was fired upon by a clearly weaker Spanish small gunboat, and she retired.

Six days later, she herself bombarded Morro Island. Several times during the summer, she returned to Key West to load mail, stores, and despatches for the squadron off Havana, and on 14 August she returned to Charleston, S.C.. Foote was out of commission at New York from 28 October 1898 to 9 November 1900, then operated in the Newport-Boston area until placed in reserve at Norfolk 6 March 1901. In 1908 she moved to Charleston.

Detached from the Reserve Torpedo Flotilla 8 June 1910, Foote based on Charleston for the next year, putting to sea only for a 3-week cruise early in 1911. From 27 June 1911 to 15 November 1916, she was assigned to the North Carolina Naval Militia, based at New Bern, then lay at Charleston until returned to full commission 7 April 1917. Through World War I, Foote patrolled the coast of the 6th Naval District; renamed Coast Torpedo Boat No. 1 1 August 1918. She was decommissioned at Philadelphia 28 March 1919, and sold 19 July 1920.

== Bibliography ==
- Grobmeier, Alvin H. (1990). "Question 2/89". Warship International. XXVII (2): 198–199. ISSN 0043-0374.
- Technical data from Gardiner, Robert (1979). Conway's All The World's Fighting Ships 1860-1905. Conway Maritime Press. p. 160. ISBN 0-85177-133-5.
