= John Rodgers (admiral) =

American admiral (1812–1882)

- Rodgers during the Civil War
- Born: August 8, 1812; Havre de Grace, Maryland, U.S.
- Died: May 5, 1882 (aged 69); Washington, D.C., U.S.
- Burial place: Oak Hill Cemetery; Washington, D.C., U.S.
- Relatives: John Rodgers (father); William L. Rodgers (son); John Rodgers (grandson); Montgomery C. Meigs; (brother in law)
- Military career
- Allegiance: United States
- Branch: United States Navy
- Service years: 1828–1882
- Rank: Rear admiral
- Conflicts: Seminole Wars; American Civil War; Korean Expedition

John Rodgers (August 8, 1812 – May 5, 1882) was an admiral in the United States Navy. He began his naval career as a commander in the American Civil War and during his postwar service became an admiral.

== Early life and career ==
Rodgers, a son of the famous Commodore John Rodgers, was born near Havre de Grace, Maryland. He received his appointment as a midshipman in the Navy on April 18, 1828. Service in the Mediterranean on board Constellation and Concord opened his long career of distinguished service, and he commanded an expedition of Naval Infantry and Marines in Florida during the Seminole Wars. In the mid-1850s he succeeded Commander Ringgold in command of the North Pacific Exploring and Surveying Expedition, which added greatly to the knowledge of far eastern and northern waters. Following his promotion to commander in 1855, he married and settled to work in the Navy's Japan Office in Washington, D.C., where he was serving when the Civil War broke out.

== Civil War service ==
Commander Rodgers' first war assignment was to go with Commodore Louis M. Goldsborough to Gosport Navy Yard on April 20, 1861, where with other officers he was to remove Naval vessels and assets so they could not be used by the Confederates. Virginia had only just declared her secession from the Union. Upon arrival they found the yard in shambles, as Commodore McCauley had already ordered the vessels at Gosport scuttled, including the Merrimack, since he considered the yard indefensible. Commodore Goldsborough made the decision to destroy the yard, and Commander Rodgers and Army Captain of Engineers Horatio G. Wright were given the job of destroying the drydock. They were thwarted in this attempt when the fuse was extinguished by water in the pumping gallery. Commander Rodgers and Captain Wright were captured by General William B. Taliaferro of the Virginia State Militia, but since Virginia had not yet joined the Confederate States, and was therefore not at war against the United States, Governor John Letcher returned the two officers to Washington.

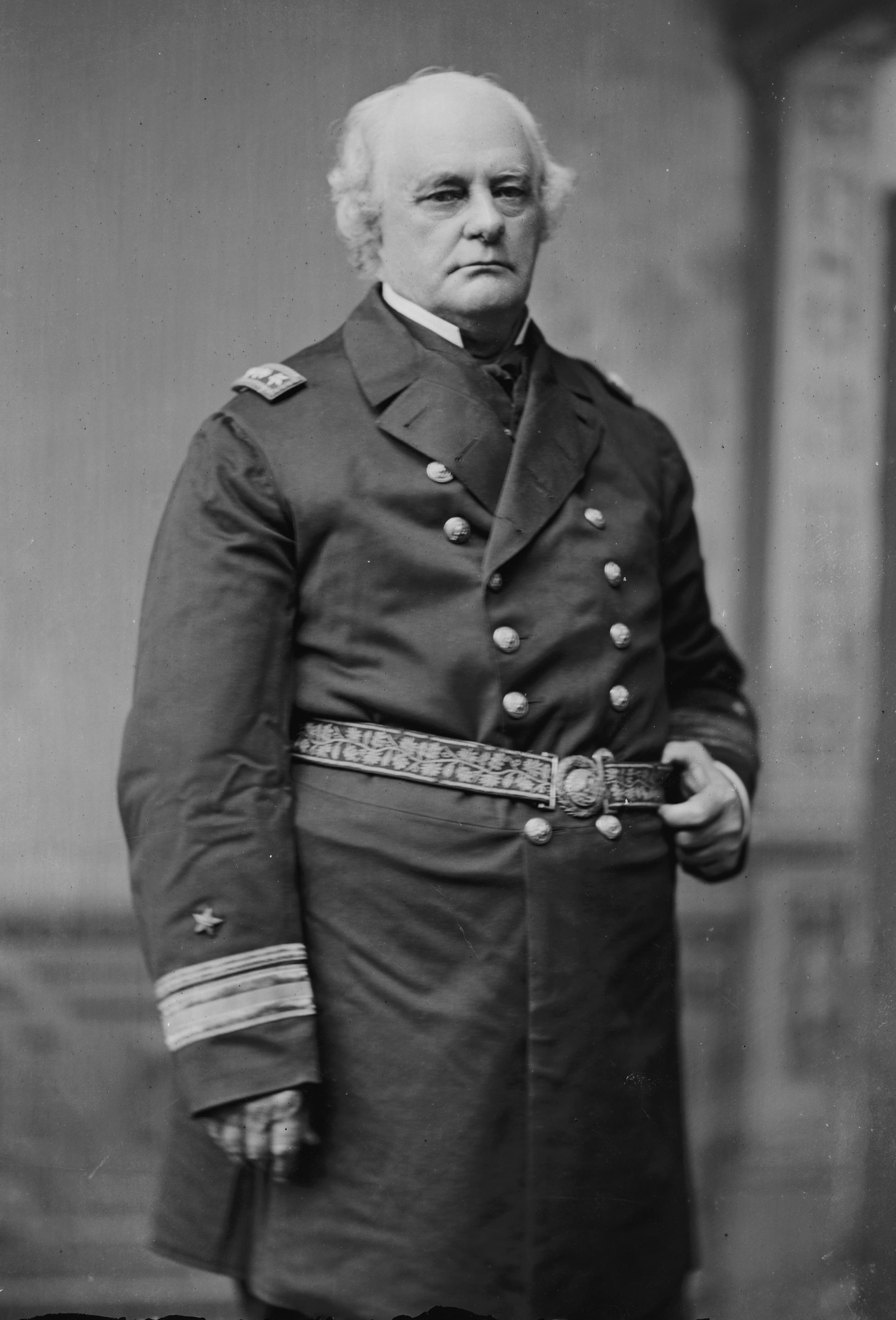
John Rodgers as rear admiral

Commander Rodgers was then sent to the Western Rivers, where he organized the Western Flotilla and supervised construction of the City-class gunboats, the first ironclad gunboats on the western rivers. He was relieved by Captain Andrew Hull Foote, a more senior officer being required by the Navy to deal with the prickly Major General John C. Fremont. After blockading operations off of Savannah in command of the Flag, he assumed command of the experimental ironclad Galena in April 1862, operating with distinction in the James River. He commanded the James River Flotilla, including the USS Galena, the ironclad Monitor, and the 90-day gunboat Aroostook in an expedition up the James River in May 1862, which was stopped eight miles shy of Richmond by Confederate fortifications at Drewry's Bluff. The damage that the Galena suffered in the ensuing battle caused him to report, "We demonstrated that she is not shotproof", and made him disdainful of trying experiments in the fires of war. Thereafter he supported General McClellan's Peninsula Campaign with Naval bombardment, preventing Confederate forces from overrunning the Army of the Potomac's position.

John Rodgers was promoted to captain July 16, 1862 and took command of the ironclad monitor Weehawken. After successfully navigating her from Brooklyn to Charleston through the same storm that sank the USS Monitor, he distinguished himself during the attack on Fort Sumter in May 1863, and in capturing the Confederate ram Atlanta on June 17, 1863. The latter service won him the Thanks of Congress and promotion to commodore. Unfortunately, this was his last active service in the Civil War. After recovering from an illness, he took command of the ironclad monitor Dictator. Design and construction problems with that vessel kept him occupied for the remainder of the war, though he earnestly desired a more active post.

== Post-war career ==
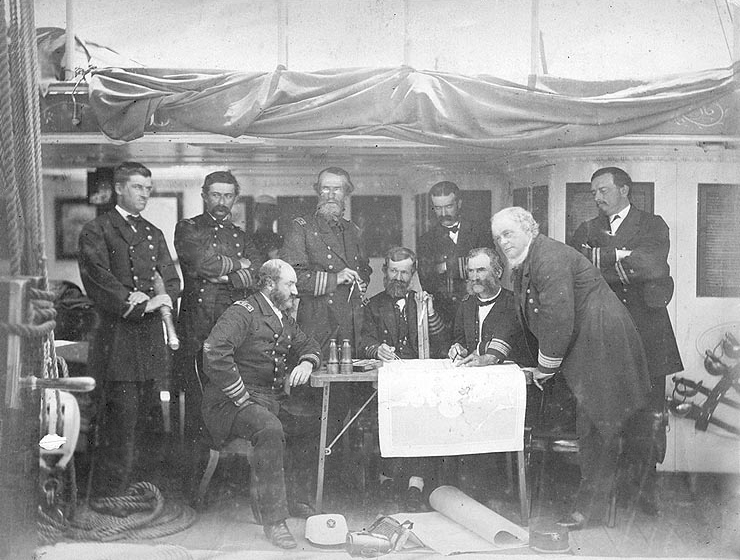
Rear Admiral Rodgers as Asiatic Squadron commander, leaning over the table at right in this posed photograph of U.S. Navy officers holding a council of war aboard his flagship, the steam frigate USS Colorado, off Korea in June 1871 prior to the Korean Expedition

Rodgers then commanded the Boston Navy Yard from 1866 until 1869. He was elevated to rear admiral in December 1869 and given command of the Asiatic Squadron on February 5, 1870. In 1871, he commanded the American squadron in the United States expedition to Korea. Upon returning to the United States, he was selected for command of Mare Island on June 15, 1873, where he served for almost four years. He was appointed Superintendent of the United States Naval Observatory in April 1877 and died in the role in Washington, D.C., on May 5, 1882. He was buried at Oak Hill Cemetery in Washington, D.C.

== Namesake ==
Rodgers' father was Commodore John Rodgers (1772–1838) and his grandfather, also named John Rodgers, was a colonel who commanded a regiment during the Revolutionary War. Admiral Rodgers was the grandfather of pioneering Naval aviator Commander John Rodgers (1881–1926). Six ships of the United States Navy have been named in their honor; either as USS John Rodgers or USS Rodgers.

== Family ==
He was the father of William L. Rodgers, who became an Vice Admiral in the U.S. Navy.

His brother, Robert Smith Rodgers, served as a colonel in the Union Army during the American Civil War and was married to Sarah C. Perry who was the daughter of Commodore Matthew C. Perry. His nephews Frederick Rodgers and John Augustus Rodgers (1848–1933) (sons of Robert), would both become Rear Admirals in the United States Navy.

== See also ==
- Calbraith Perry Rodgers
- Bibliography of Naval history of the American Civil War

Military offices
Preceded by Stephen C. Rowan	Commander, Asiatic Squadron; August 19, 1870–May 12, 1872	Succeeded by Thornton A. Jenkins
