= Perry family =

American naval and political dynasty from Rhode Island

Perry
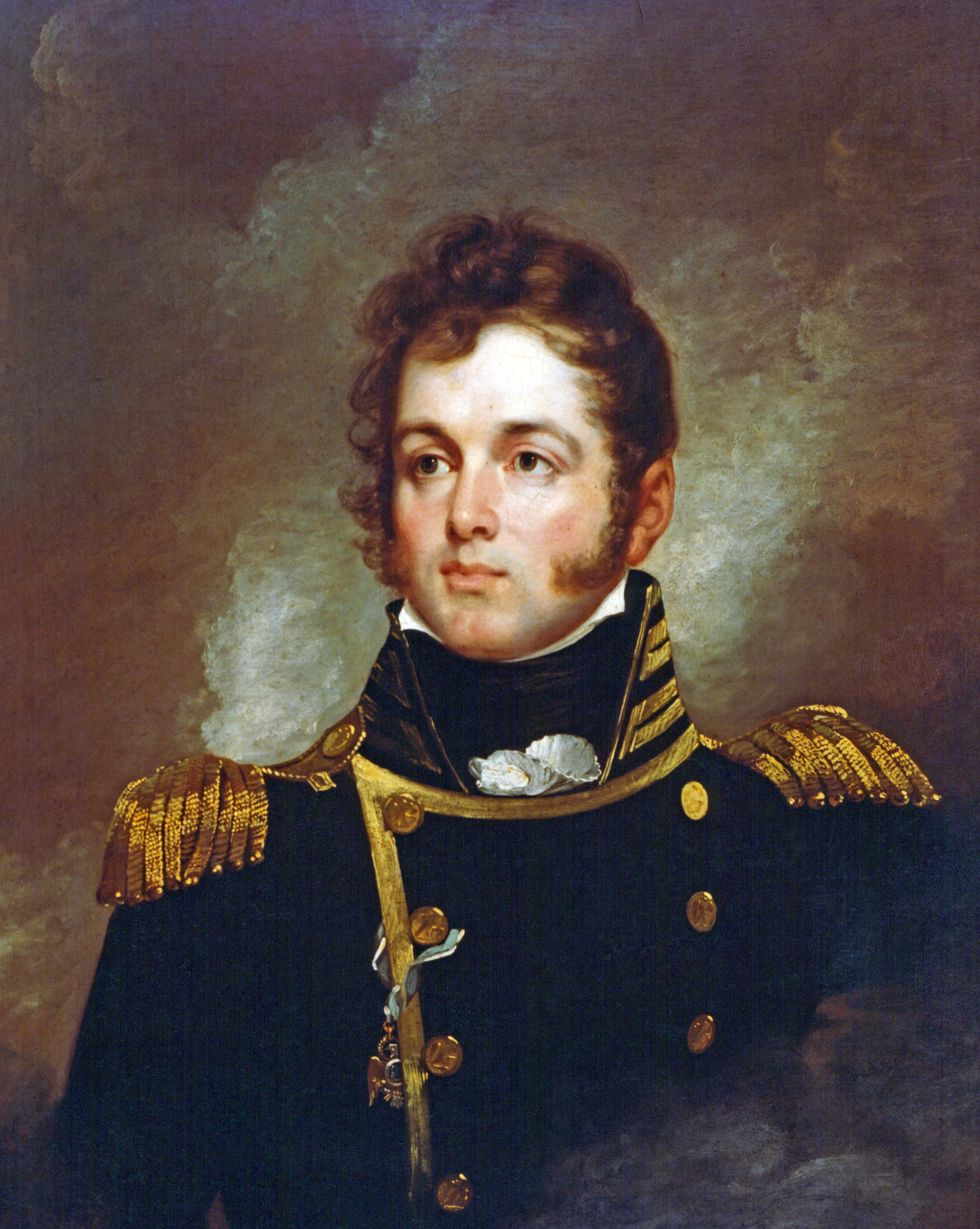
- Portrait of Captain Oliver Hazard Perry, USN (1839) by Edward L. Mooney
- Current region: South Kingstown, Rhode Island, and New England
- Origin: England; Ireland; Scotland
- Connected families: Rodgers family Belmont family Whitney family Vanderbilt family Randolph family De Peyster family
- Estates: Commodore Oliver Perry Farm, Sion Hill (Havre De Grace, Maryland), Belcourt
- Military career
- Allegiance: United States of America
- Service years: 1799–

The Perry family is an American naval and political dynasty from Rhode Island whose members have included several United States naval commanders, naval aviators, politicians, artists, clergymen, lawyers, physicians, and socialites. Progeny of a mid-17th-century English immigrant to South Kingstown, Rhode Island, the Perry family patriarch, Captain Christopher Raymond Perry, and his two sons Commodore Oliver Hazard Perry and Commodore Matthew C. Perry, were seminal figures in the legitimization of the United States Navy and establishment of the United States Naval Academy.

== History ==
=== The Rhode Island Perrys and their origin ===
Christopher Raymond Perry was born on December 4, 1761, in Newport, Rhode Island, the son of the Hon. Judge (James) Freeman Perry (1732–1813) and his wife, Mercy Hazard (1739–1810).

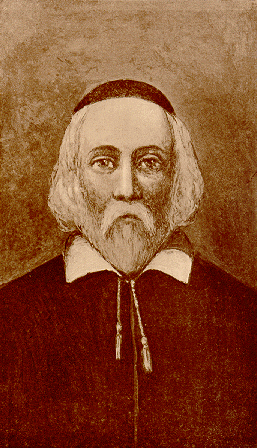
Christopher R. Perry was a descendant of Elder William Brewster (pictured) as well as Plymouth colonists Thomas Prence and George Soule

Judge Freeman Perry was a physician and surgeon in the Revolutionary War, as well as a local magistrate who served as Judge of the Court of Washington County and President of the Town Council of South Kingstown. Christopher Raymond Perry's paternal great-grandfather, Edward Perry, came from Devon, England, in 1637 and settled in Sandwich, Massachusetts, where he married his wife, Mary Freeman, in 1653.

Mercy Hazard was a seventh-generation descendant of Captain Richard Raymond (1602–1692), and his wife, Julia, who was likely born in Essex County, England, in 1602 and arrived in Salem, Massachusetts, about 1629, possibly with a contingent led by the Rev. Francis Higginson. He was about 27 years old and later was a founder of Norwich, Connecticut, and an "honored fore-father of Saybrook". Mercy Hazard was also a descendant of Governor Thomas Prence (1599–1673), a co-founder of Eastham, Massachusetts, who was a political leader in both the Plymouth Colony and Massachusetts Bay Colony, and governor of Plymouth; and a descendant of two Mayflower passengers, both of whom were signers of the Mayflower Compact, Elder William Brewster (c. 1567 – 1644), the Pilgrim colonist leader and spiritual elder of the Plymouth Colony, and George Soule (1593–1679). Christopher Perry was also descended from Soule through his grandmother Susannah Barber Perry (1697–1755).

== American Revolution ==
Christopher Perry enlisted, at the age of 14, in a local militia company named the Kingston Reds early in the American Revolution. He then served on a privateer commanded by a Captain Reed. After one cruise with Reed, Perry signed on to the privateer Mifflin commanded by George Wait Babcock. The Mifflin was captured by the British and Perry was confined to the infamous prison ship Jersey in New York harbor for three months before he managed to escape.

In 1779, Perry joined the Continental Navy as a seaman aboard the frigate USS Trumbull commanded by Captain James Nicholson. On June 1, 1780, the Trumbull engaged the British letter of marque Watt in a hard-fought, but indecisive, action in which the Trumbull suffered 8 killed and 31 wounded compared to the Watt's 13 killed and 79 wounded.

Perry then enlisted on another privateer which was captured off the coast of Great Britain. He then was taken as a prisoner to Newry Barracks in Ireland where he met his future wife, Sarah Wallace Alexander (1768–1830). Perry managed another escape by masquerading as a British seaman and taking passage to St. Thomas in the Virgin Islands. From St. Thomas he took passage to Charleston, South Carolina, shortly before the war's conclusion in 1783.

=== Post war ===
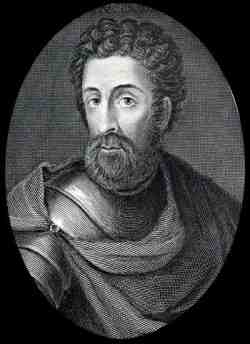
Sarah Alexander was descended from an uncle of Scottish knight William Wallace

After the war, Perry served as a mate on a merchantman which sailed to Ireland where Perry was able to bring his beloved Sarah to the United States. They were married in Philadelphia on August 2, 1784. The young couple then moved to South Kingstown, Rhode Island, where they lived with Perry's parents on their 200-acre estate. Their first child, Oliver Hazard Perry, was born in August 1785.

Sarah Wallace (née Alexander) was born in County Down, Ireland and was a descendant of an uncle of William Wallace, the Scottish knight and landowner who is known for leading a resistance during the Wars of Scottish Independence and is today remembered as a patriot and national hero.

Christopher Raymond Perry died June 1, 1818, in Newport, Rhode Island.

=== The two brothers ===
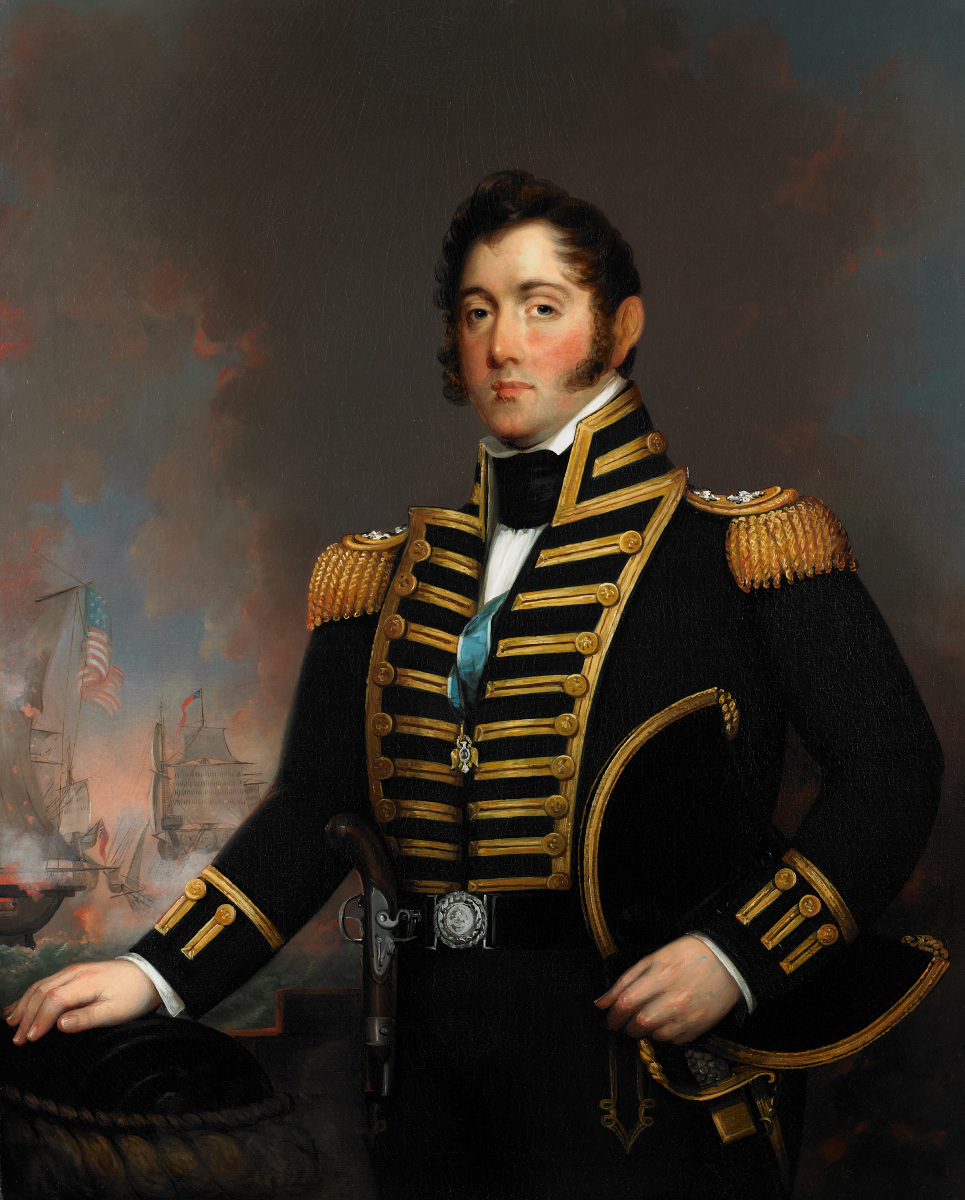
Oliver Hazard Perry

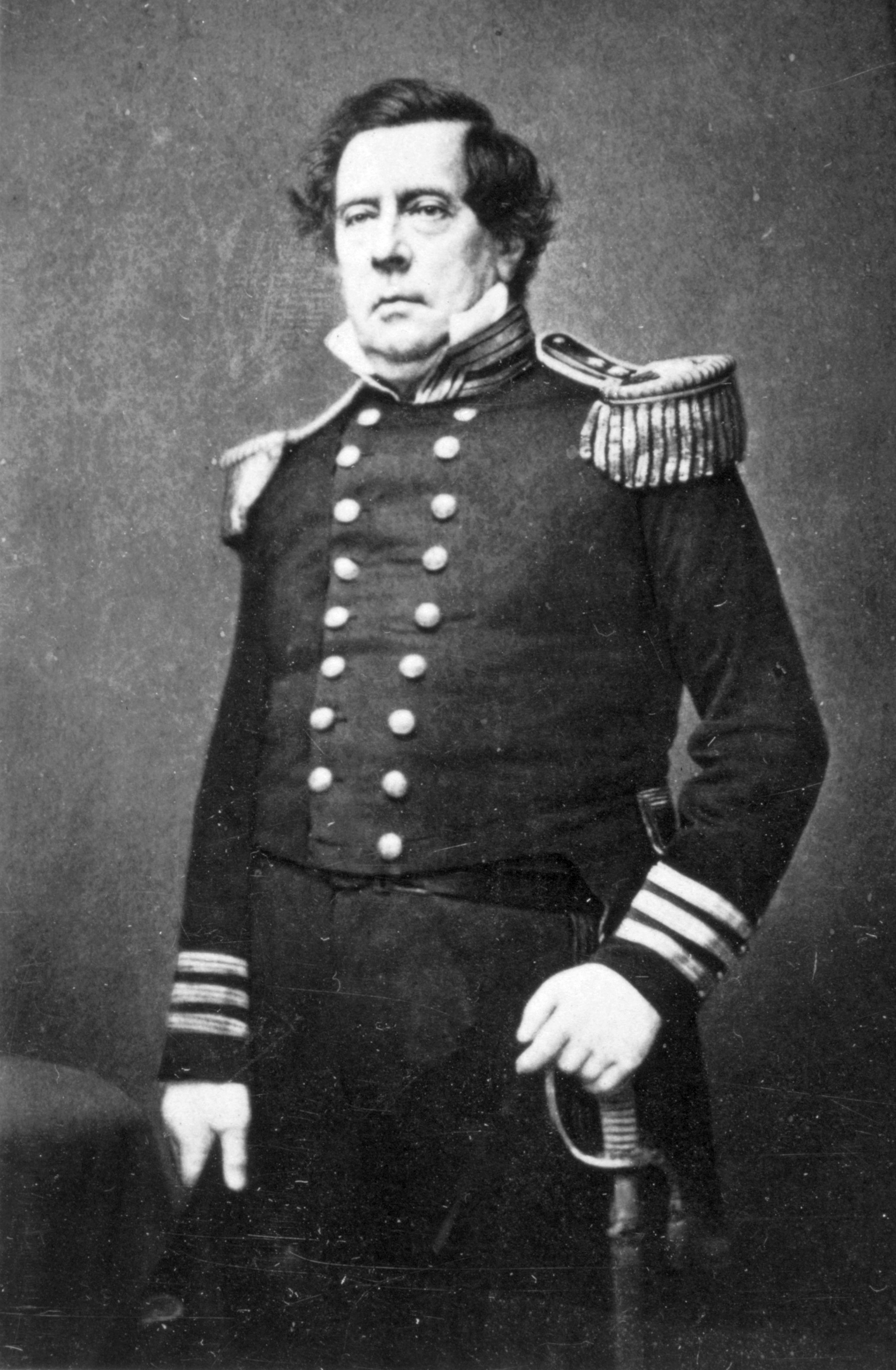
Matthew Calbraith Perry

Oliver Hazard Perry (1785–1819) was an American naval commander, born in South Kingstown, Rhode Island. As the most well-known and prominent member of the naval dynasty, he was the son of Sarah Wallace Alexander and United States Navy Captain Christopher Raymond Perry, and older brother of Commodore Matthew C. Perry.

Perry served in the West Indies during the Quasi-War of 1798–1800 against France, in the Mediterranean during the Barbary Wars of 1801–1815, and in the Caribbean fighting piracy and the slave trade, but is most noted for his heroic role in the War of 1812 during the 1813 Battle of Lake Erie. During the war against Britain, Perry supervised the building of a fleet at Erie, Pennsylvania. He earned the title "Hero of Lake Erie" for leading American forces in a decisive naval victory at the Battle of Lake Erie, receiving a Congressional Gold Medal and the Thanks of Congress. His leadership materially aided the successful outcomes of all nine Lake Erie military campaign victories, and the victory was a turning point in the battle for the west in the war. He is remembered for the words on his battle flag, "Don't Give Up the Ship", which was a tribute to the dying command of his colleague Captain James Lawrence of USS Chesapeake. He is also known for his message to General William Henry Harrison which reads in part, "We have met the enemy and they are ours; ..."

Perry became embroiled in a long-standing and bitter controversy with the commander of USS Niagara, Captain Jesse Elliott, over their conduct in the Battle of Lake Erie, and both were the subject of official charges. In 1815, Perry successfully commanded Java in the Mediterranean during the Second Barbary War. So seminal was his career that he was lionized in the press (being the subject of scores of books and articles). He has been frequently memorialized, and many places, ships and persons have been named in his honor.

Matthew Calbraith Perry (Note: Perry's middle name is often misspelled as Galbraith instead of Calbraith) (1794–1858) was a Commodore of the United States Navy who commanded ships in several wars, including the War of 1812 and the Mexican–American War (1846–1848). He played a leading role in the opening of Japan to the West with the Convention of Kanagawa in 1854.

Perry was interested in the education of naval officers, and assisted in the development of an apprentice system that helped establish the curriculum at the United States Naval Academy. With the advent of the steam engine, he became a leading advocate of modernizing the U.S. Navy and came to be considered "The Father of the Steam Navy" in the United States.

== Civil War and Reconstruction era ==
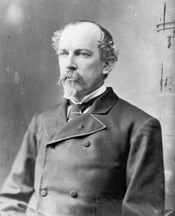
Matthew Calbraith Butler, who served as a Democratic United States Senator from South Carolina, 1877–1895

Rear Admiral Christopher Raymond Perry Rodgers (1819–1892) was born on November 4, 1819, in Brooklyn, New York to George Washington Rodgers and Anna Maria Perry. He served as an officer in the United States Navy and Commander-in-Chief of the Pacific Squadron in the Mexican–American War and the American Civil War, as well as Superintendent of the Naval Academy and President of the United States Naval Institute.

Matthew Calbraith Butler, who was born on March 8, 1836, at Eagle's Crag near Greenville, South Carolina, was the son of U.S. Congressman William Butler and Jane Tweedy Perry. Butler served as a major general in the Confederate States Army during the American Civil War, postbellum three-term United States Democratic Senator from South Carolina, and a major general in the United States Army during the Spanish–American War.

== The Gilded Age and the Belmont branch ==
On November 7, 1849, August Belmont Sr. married Caroline Slidell Perry (1829–1892), the daughter of Matthew Calbraith Perry. According to Jewish newspaper sources, Belmont converted to Christianity at that time, taking his wife's Episcopalian/Anglican faith. Together, they were the parents of six children, with all of his surviving sons becoming involved in politics:

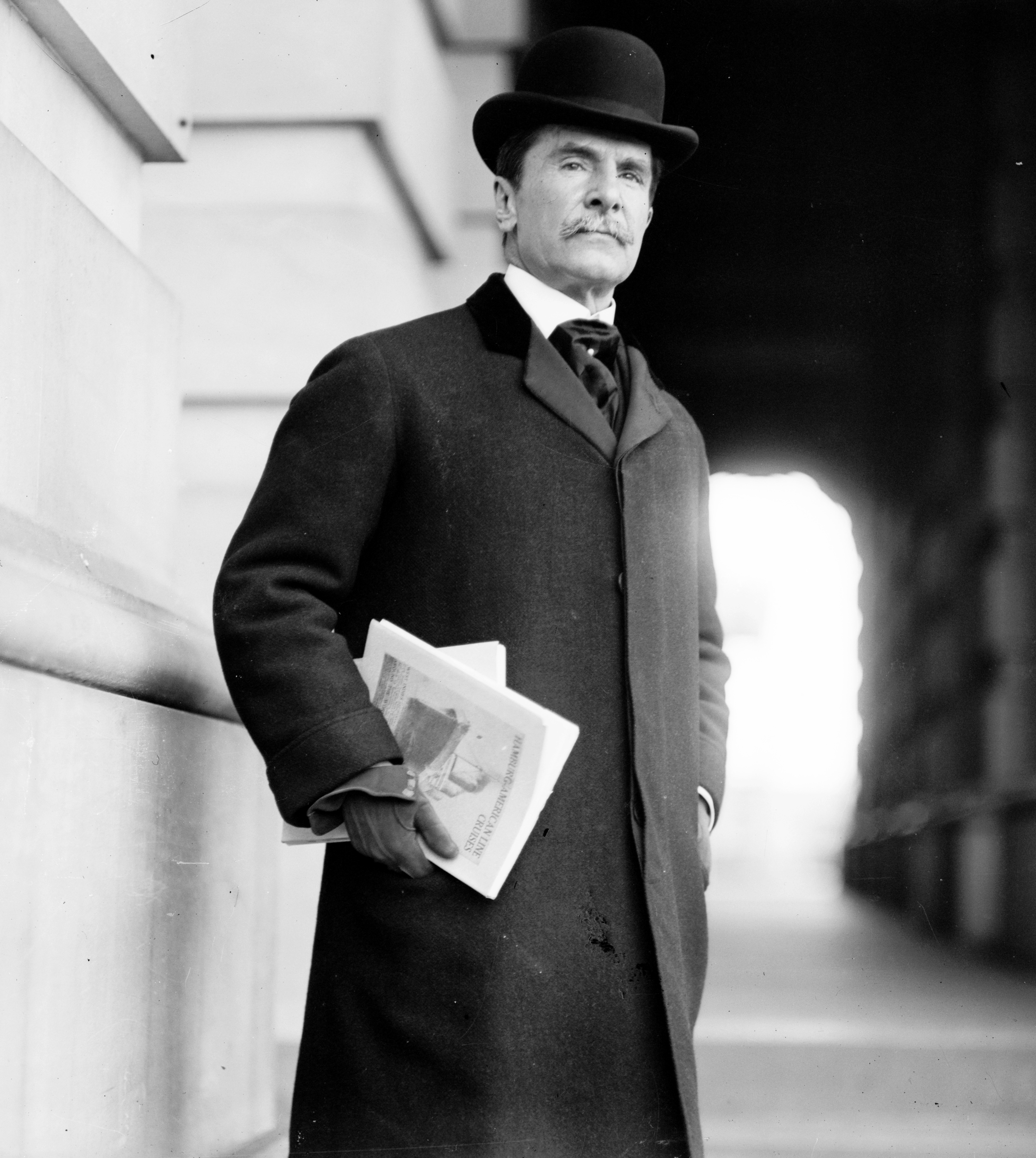
Perry Belmont in 1913, following his tenure in the United States House of Representatives and U.S. Ambassador to Spain

Perry Belmont (1851–1947), served as a Democrat to the 47th Congress, followed by a career in the U.S. representative for the first district of New York from March 4, 1881, until his resignation on December 1, 1888. During his first term, he was a member of the committee on foreign affairs; noted for his cross-examination of James G. Blaine, the former secretary of state. Belmont also served from 1885 to 1887 as chairman of the committee on foreign affairs, and on October 6, 1890, was invested as a Commander of the French Legion of Honor. In 1898, during the Spanish–American War, Perry served for six weeks in the Army as an Inspector General of the First Division, Second Army Corps, United States Volunteers, with the rank of major. He was appointed United States Minister to Spain that same year. During the First World War, despite being 65 years old, Belmont was commissioned as a captain in the U.S. Army Quartermaster Corps on May 5, 1917. He was assigned to the Remount Division in Washington, D.C., and was discharged on May 21, 1920.

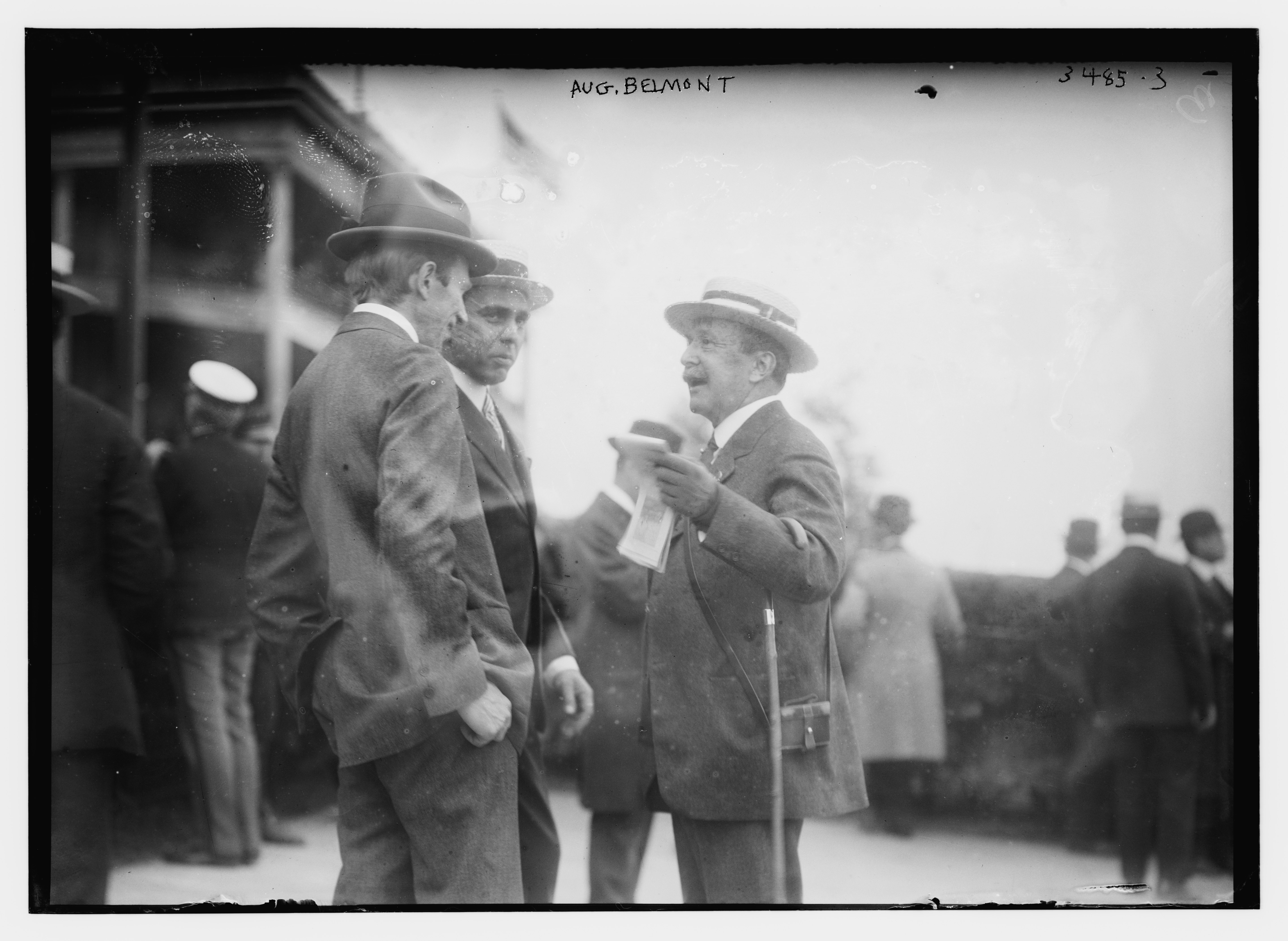
August Belmont Jr. (pictured here in 1910), was the foremost champion of thoroughbred racing in the United States.

August Belmont Jr. (1853–1924), was an American financier who levied the construction of the original New York subway (1900–1904) and for many years headed the Interborough Rapid Transit Co., which ran the transit system. He also financed and led the construction of the Cape Cod Canal in Massachusetts, which opened in 1914. Belmont bought the land for and built New York's Belmont Park racetrack—named for his father—and was a major owner/breeder of thoroughbred racehorses. He served as chairman of the board of the Louisville and Nashville Railroad. He also served as a director of the Southern Pacific Co., parent of the railroad, and National Park Bank. He and his brother, Perry Belmont, were also founding members of The Jockey Club.

Fredericka Belmont (1856–1902), who married Samuel Shaw Howland (1849–1925), son of Gardiner Greene Howland of Howland & Aspinwall.

Oliver Hazard Perry Belmont (1858–1908), was a member of the banking firm of August Belmont and Co., New York City, and a publisher of the Verdict, a weekly paper, who additionally served as delegate to the Democratic National Convention in 1900, and was elected as a Democrat from New York's 13th District to the Fifty-seventh Congress serving from March 4, 1901, until March 3, 1903.

Raymond Rodgers Belmont (1863–1887), was a champion polo player who participated in the 1886 International Polo Cup with teammates William Knapp Thorn, Foxhall Parker Keene and Thomas Hitchcock Sr., and later died on January 31, 1887, in New York City, by shooting himself in the side of the head with a pistol. He was buried in the Common Burying Ground and Island Cemetery in Newport, Rhode Island.

== The Spanish American War and WWI ==
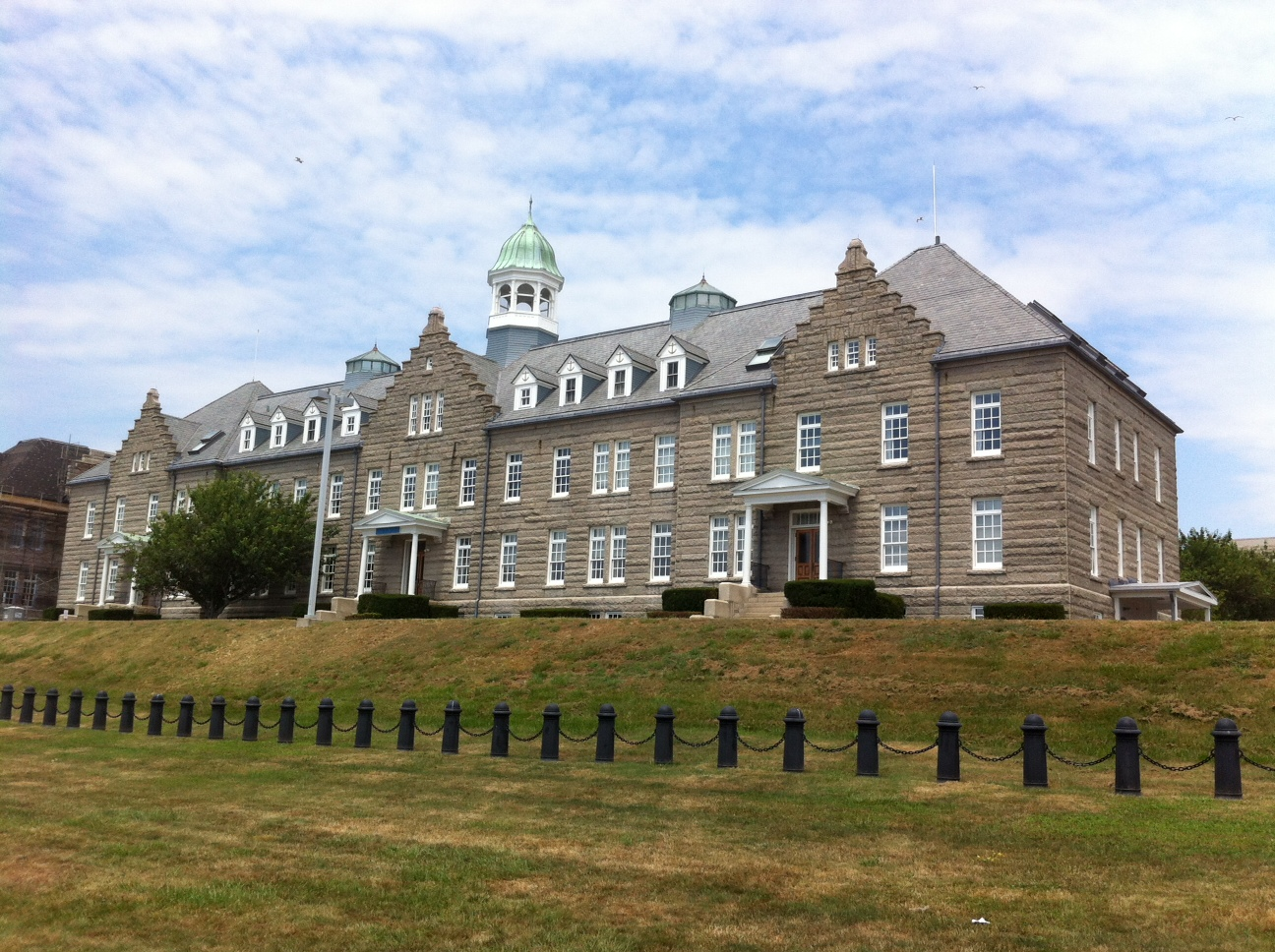
Both Raymond Perry Rodgers and William Ledyard Rodgers served as presidents (consecutively) of the U.S. Naval War College in Newport, R.I.

Rear Admiral Raymond Perry Rodgers (1849–1925) was an officer in the United States Navy. He served as the second head of the Office of Naval Intelligence and as the 12th President of the Naval War College and fought in the Spanish–American War. He spent the four years from 1894 to 1898 as Naval Attaché in France and Russia. Throughout the war with Spain he was Executive Officer of the battleship Iowa, and for most of the war was stationed off Santiago de Cuba. He was advanced five numbers for eminent and conspicuous conduct in the battle which destroyed Cervera's squadron.

While in command of the Nashville from 1899 to 1901, Admiral Rodgers, then ranking as a Commander, served in the West Indies and the Philippines, and in China during the Boxer troubles. For the next two years he was captain of the battleship Kearsarge of the Atlantic Fleet and then for three years was Chief Intelligence Officer with the Navy Department. In October 1909, he became president of the Naval War College and commandant of the Naval Station at Narragansett Bay.

Rear Admiral Thomas S. Rodgers (1858–1931) was an officer in the United States Navy who served during the Spanish–American War and World War I.

William Ledyard Rodgers (1860–1944) was a vice admiral of the United States Navy. His career included service in the Spanish–American War and World War I, and a tour as President of the Naval War College. Rodgers was also a noted historian on military and naval topics, particularly relating to ancient naval warfare.

== Aviation pioneers ==
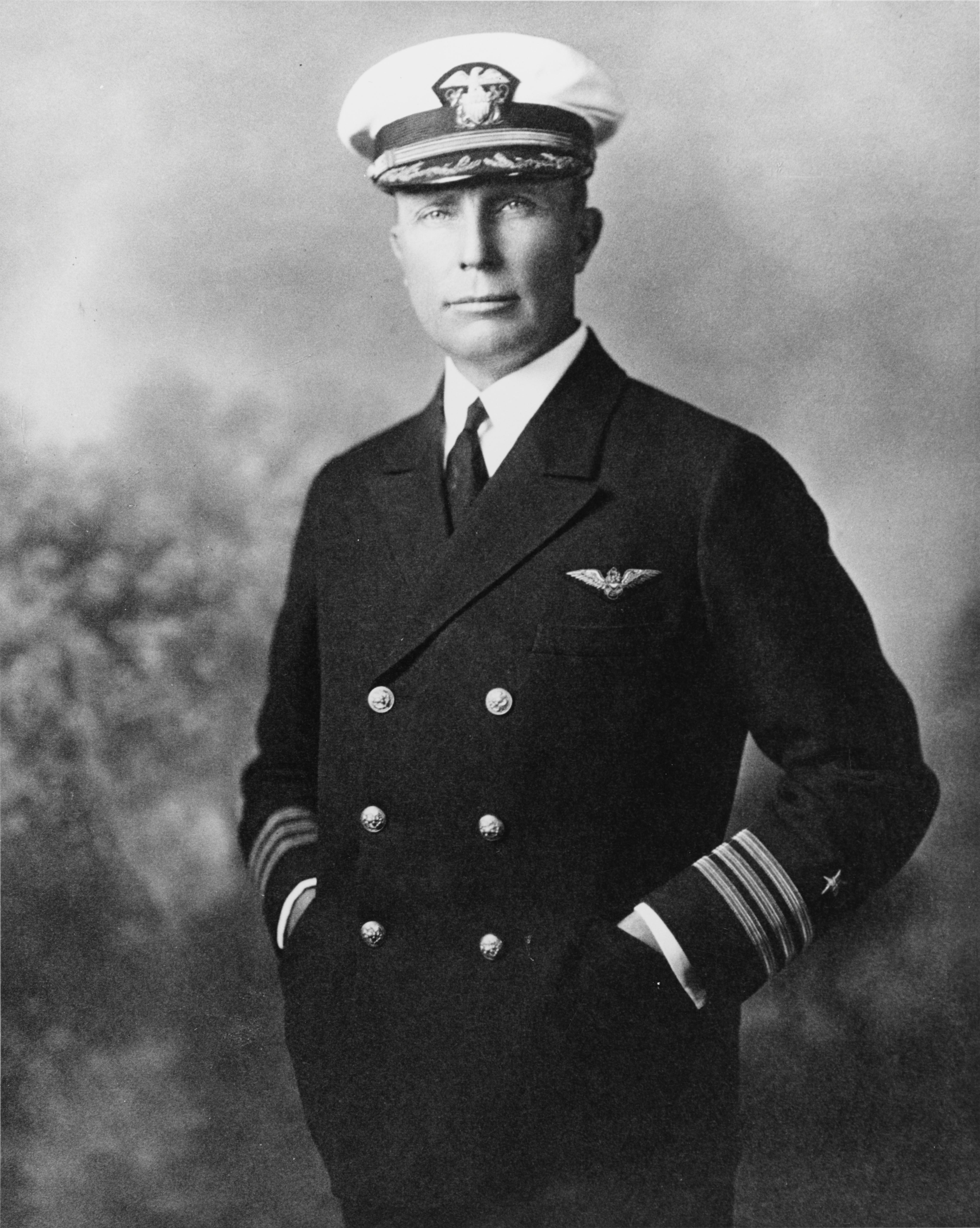
Commander John Rodgers, USN

John Rodgers (1881–1926) was an officer in the United States Navy and a pioneering aviator who led the first attempt at a non-stop flight from California to Hawaii. Given the technology of the time, this tested the limits of both aircraft range and the accuracy of aerial navigation. The expedition was to include three planes. Rodgers commanded the flying boat PN-9 No. 1. The PN-9 No. 3 was commanded by Lt. Allen P. Snody. The third plane was to have been a new design, which was not completed in time to join the expedition. Due to the risks, the Navy positioned 10 guard ships spaced 200 miles apart between California and Hawaii to refuel or recover the aircraft if necessary. The two PN-9s departed San Pablo Bay, California (near San Francisco) on August 31. Lt. Snody's plane had an engine failure about five hours into its flight, was forced to land in the ocean, and was safely recovered.

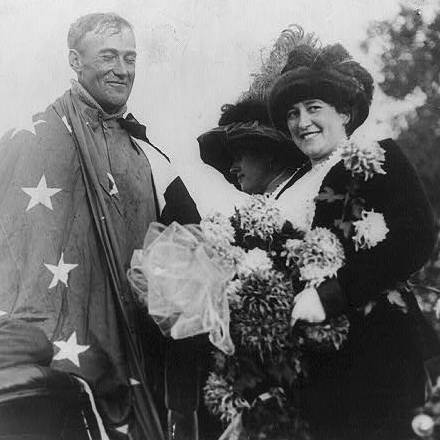
Calbraith "Cal" Rodgers in Pasadena, California

Calbraith Perry Rodgers (1879–1912) was an American aviation pioneer, the cousin of the aforementioned, who made the first transcontinental airplane flight across the U.S. from September 17, 1911, to November 5, 1911, with dozens of stops, both intentional and accidental. On October 10, 1910, publisher William Randolph Hearst offered the Hearst prize, US$50,000 to the first aviator to fly coast to coast, in either direction, in less than 30 days from start to finish. Rodgers persuaded J. Ogden Armour, of Armour and Company, to sponsor the flight, and in return he named the plane, a Wright Model EX, after Armour's grape soft drink Vin Fiz. A special train of three cars, including sleeper, diner, and shop-on-wheels full of spare parts, was assembled to follow Rodgers, who planned to fly above the railroad tracks. The feat made him a national celebrity, but he was killed in a crash a few months later at an exhibition in California.

== WWII and the modern era ==
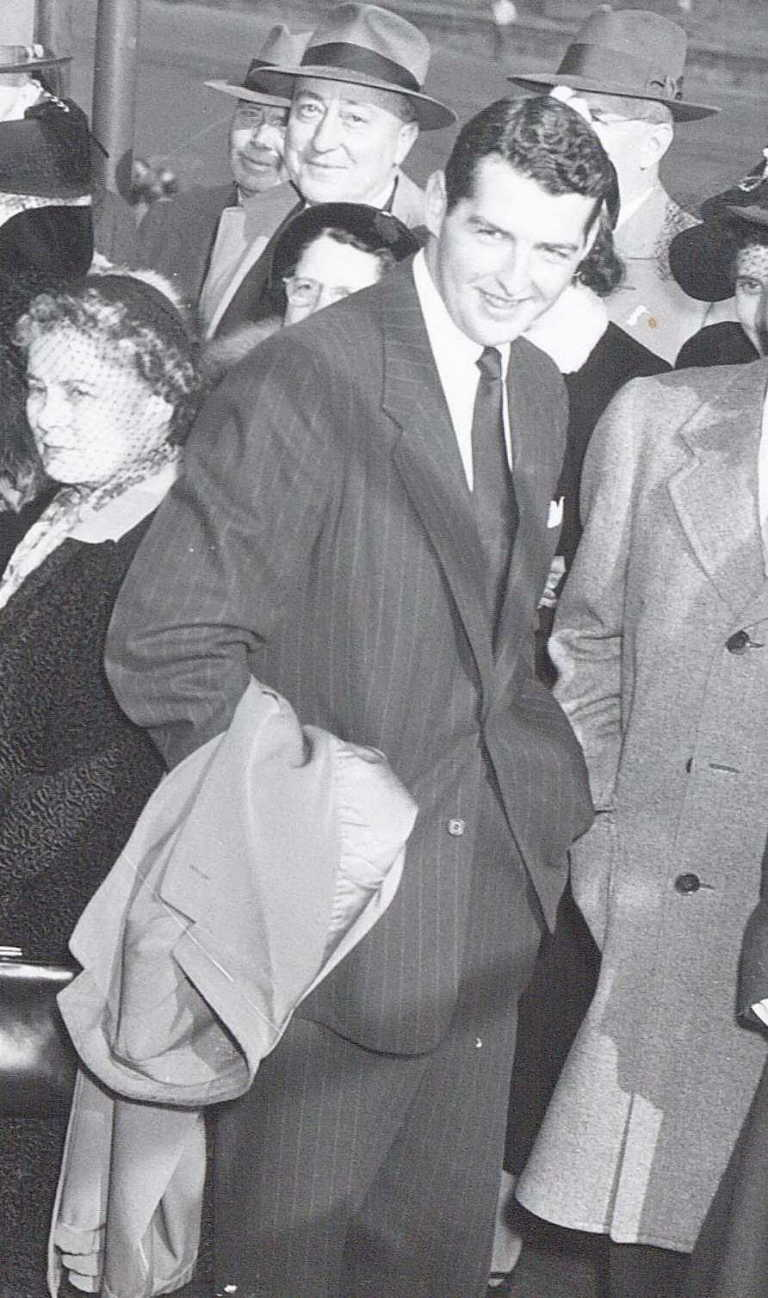
Lloyd P. Jones, son of Gulf Oil executive Willard F. Jones and Ruth A. Black

The Right Reverend James De Wolf Perry (1871–1947) was an American Episcopal clergyman and prelate who served as the 7th Bishop of Rhode Island (1911–1946) and the 18th Presiding Bishop of the Episcopal Church (1930–1937).

John LaFarge Jr. SJ (1880–1963) was an American Jesuit Catholic priest known for his activism against racism and anti-semitism. In the run-up to World War II, he worked on a draft of a papal encyclical against racist and totalitarian ideologies for Pope Pius XI; entitled Humani generis unitas, though it was never promulgated due to the death of Pius XI on February 10, 1939.

Oliver Hazard Perry La Farge (1901–1963) was an American writer and anthropologist of Native American culture, best known for his 1930 Pulitzer Prize-winning novel Laughing Boy. Oliver's older brother, Christopher La Farge (1897–1956) was a watercolor artist, poet, short story writer, and novelist whose compositions often chronicled Rhode Island life. Oliver's son, Peter La Farge (1931–1965), was an American folk music singer in Greenwich Village, who worked along with Bob Dylan, Ramblin' Jack Elliott, Dave Van Ronk, and Pete Seeger, and is famous for writing the song "The Ballad of Ira Hayes".

A great-grandniece of Oliver Hazard Perry and Matthew Calbraith Perry, Ruth Ann Black (1893–1964) married naval architect and Gulf Oil executive Willard F. Jones.

Raymond P. R. Neilson (1881–1964) was an American painter and instructor at the National Academy of Design from 1927 to 1934. Neilson studied under William Merritt Chase at the Art Students League of New York, the Académie Julian under Jean-Paul Laurens, the Ecole des Beaux Arts, Académie de la Grande Chaumière, and the Académie Colarossi.

== Family tree ==
Perry family members
- Christopher Raymond Perry (1761–1818), m. Sarah Wallace Alexander (1768–1830)
  - Oliver Hazard Perry (1785–1819), m. Elizabeth Champlin Mason, New York City assistant alderman
    - Christopher Grant Champlin Perry, RIM (1812–1854), commander of the Artillery Company of Newport from 1845 to 1854, m. Frances Muriel Sergeant (1817–1903), great-granddaughter of Benjamin Franklin
      - Frances Sergeant Perry Pepper (1848–1918) m. William Pepper Jr MD (1843–1898), Physician who discovered neuroblastoma, leader in medical education, and a longtime Provost of the University of Pennsylvania
        - William Pepper MD (1874–1947) Physician and longest serving Dean of the University of Pennsylvania School of Medicine
        - Thomas Sergeant Pepper (1876–1882)
        - Benjamin Franklin Pepper (1879–1919)
        - Oliver Hazard Perry Pepper (1884–1962)
      - Thomas Sergeant Perry (1845–1928), literary critic and Harvard University English professor, m. Lilla Cabot (1848–1933), famous impressionist painter
        - Margaret Perry (1876)
        - Edith Perry (1880)
        - Alice Perry (b. 1884), m. Joseph Clark Grew (1880–1965), the Under Secretary of State, and later, the U.S. Ambassador to Japan during the December 7, 1941, attack on Pearl Harbor
      - Margaret Mason Perry m. John LaFarge (1835–1910) American painter, muralist, stained glass window maker, decorator, and writer
        - Christopher Grant La Farge (1862–1938), a partner in the New York-based architectural firm of Heins & LaFarge who designed projects in Beaux-Arts style
          - Christopher La Farge (1897–1956)
          - Oliver Hazard Perry La Farge II (1901–1963) m. Wanden (Matthews) La Farge, a Rhode Island heiress.
            - Oliver Albee La Farge (1931–1965) folk singer
            - Povy La Farge (1933–)
        - Emily Marie La Farge (1862–1890), m. William Rehn Claxton
        - John Louis Bancel La Farge (1865–1938), who married Mabel Hooper
        - Margaret Angela La Farge (1867–1956)
        - Oliver Hazard Perry La Farge (1869–1936), an architect and real estate developer with Marshall Latham Bond, of Bond & La Farge.
        - Joseph Raymond La Farge (1872–1872), who died in infancy
        - Frances Aimee La Farge (1874–1951), who married Edward H. Childs (b. 1869)
        - John La Farge, Jr., S.J. (1880–1963), who became a Jesuit priest and a strong supporter of anti-racist policies
    - Oliver Hazard Perry II (1813–1814), died in infancy;
    - Oliver Hazard Perry, Jr., USN (1815–1878), m. 1) Elizabeth Ann Randolph (1816–1847) of the Randolph family of Virginia and m. 2) Mary Ann Moseley
    - Christopher Raymond Perry, USA (1816–1848), never married
    - Elizabeth Mason Perry, m. the Reverend Francis Vinton, rector of Trinity Episcopal Church in Newport
  - Raymond Henry Jones Perry (1789–1826), a captain in the United States Navy and veteran of War of 1812
    - James DeWolf Perry (1815-1876), a member of Rhode Island General Assembly, m. Julia Sophia Jones (1816-1898)
      - Raymond Henry Jones Perry (1836-1903), a Major in the Union army during American Civil War
      - James DeWolf Perry Jr. (1838-1927), a reverend, m. Elizabeth Russell Tyson (1841-1910)
        - James DeWolf Perry III (1871-1947), the 7th Bishop of Rhode Island (1911–1946)
      - Calbraith Bourn Perry (1845-1914), a reverend
      - Julia Bourne Perry (1850-1857)
      - Charles Varnum Perry (1853-1935), a Foreman for Coal Mines, m. Mary Isabelle Trotter (1854-1927)
        - Basil H. Perry (1893-1960), a Brigadier general during World War II
      - Oliver Hazard Perry (1859-1867)
      - William Wallace Perry (1862-1945)
    - Nancy Bradford Perry Lay (1819-1883)
    - Alexander Perry (1822-1888)
  - Sarah Wallace Perry (1791–1855)
  - Matthew Calbraith Perry (1794–1858), m. Jane Slidell Perry (1816–1864)
    - Sarah Perry (1818–1905), who married Col. Robert Smith Rodgers (1809–1891)
    - Jane Hazard Perry (1819–1881), who married John Hone (1819–1891) and Frederic de Peyster (1796–1882)
    - Matthew Calbraith Perry (1821–1873), a captain in the United States Navy and veteran of the Mexican War and the Civil War.
    - Susan Murgatroyde Perry (1825–1896)
    - Oliver Hazard Perry (1825–1870)
    - William Frederick Perry (1828–1884), a 2nd Lieutenant, United States Marine Corps, 1847–1848.
    - Caroline Slidell Perry Belmont (1829–1892), who married financier August Belmont, 1813–1890
      - Perry Belmont (1851–1947), who married Jessie Ann Robbins (1858–1935), the divorced wife of Henry T. Sloane.
      - August Belmont Jr. (1853–1924) who married Elizabeth Hamilton Morgan (1862–1898). After her death, he married Eleanor Robson (1879–1979), an actress.
        - August Belmont III (1882-1919)
        - Raymond Belmont II (1888–1934)
        - Morgan Belmont (1892–1953) m. Margaret Frances Andrews.
      - Jane Pauline "Jennie" Belmont (1856–1875)
      - Fredericka Belmont (1856–1902), m. Samuel Shaw Howland (1849–1925), founder of Howland & Aspinwall
      - Oliver Hazard Perry Belmont (1858–1908), who married Sarah Swan Whiting (1861–1924). They divorced, she married George L. Rives and he married Alva Erskine Smith (1853–1933), former wife of William Kissam Vanderbilt.
      - Raymond Rodgers Belmont (1863–1887), who accidentally shot "himself while practicing with a pistol."
    - Isabella Bolton Perry (1834–1912), who married George Tiffany
    - Anna Rodgers Perry (1838–1922)
  - Anna Maria Perry (1797–1858), m. George Washington Rodgers (1787–1832)
    - George Washington Rodgers (1822–1863)
    - Alexander Perry Rodgers (1825–1847)
    - Elizabeth Rodgers Smith (1827–1906)
    - Sarah S. Rodgers Perry (1831–1901) m. Capt E.A. Perry
      - Anna Perry Rodgers (1859–1933) m. Alexander Black
        - Ruth Ann Black (1893–1964) m. Willard F. Jones (1890–1967), Naval architect and Gulf Oil executive
          - Willard Edmund Jones, USN (1917–1971)
          - Lloyd Paul Jones (1922–2002), Bethlehem Steel executive, m. Patricia Anne Larkin
    - Christopher Raymond Perry Rodgers m. Julia Slidell,
      - Raymond Perry Rodgers (1849–1925)
      - Thomas Slidell Rodgers (1858–1931)
  - Jane Tweedy Perry (1799–1875), m. William Butler, Jr. (1790–1850), a surgeon and United States Congressman.
    - Matthew Calbraith Butler (1836–1909)
  - James Alexander Perry (1801–1822)
  - Nathaniel Hazard Perry (1803–1832), who served as a purser (i.e., a supply and pay officer) in the U.S. Navy from 1820 until his death.
