= Admiral Rodgers =

Admiral Rodgers may refer to:

- Bertram J. Rodgers (1894–1983), U.S. Navy vice admiral
- Christopher Raymond Perry Rodgers (1819–1892), U.S. Navy rear admiral
- Frederick Rodgers (1842–1917), U.S. Navy rear admiral
- John Rodgers (admiral) (1812–1882), U.S. Navy rear admiral
- Michael S. Rogers (born 1959), U.S. Navy admiral
- Raymond P. Rodgers (1849–1925), U.S. Navy rear admiral
- Thomas S. Rodgers (1858–1931), U.S. Navy rear admiral
- William Ledyard Rodgers (1860–1944), U.S. Navy vice admiral

== See also ==
- John Rodgers (naval officer, born 1772) (1772–1838), U.S. Navy commodore (admiral equivalent rank)
- Michael S. Rogers (born 1959), U.S. Navy admiral
