= Christopher Raymond Perry =

United States Navy officer and judge

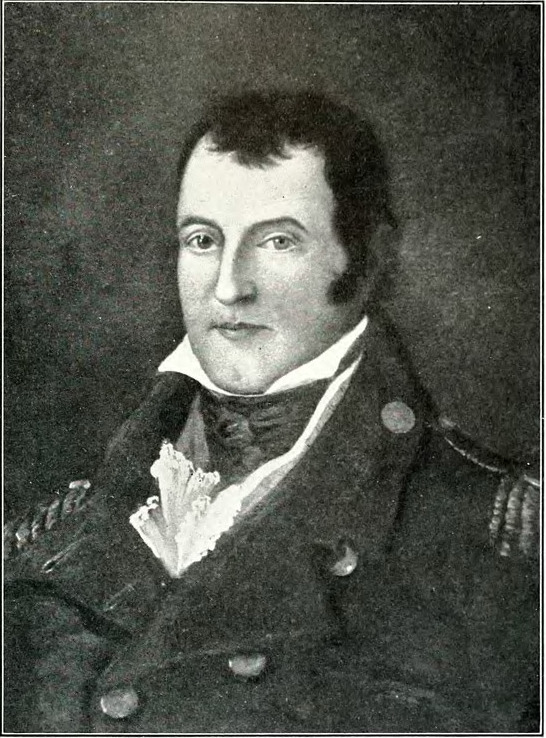

Chief Justice of the Court of Common Pleas for Washington County
- In office 1780–1791

Personal details
- Born: December 4, 1761 South Kingstown, Colony of Rhode Island and Providence Plantations, British America
- Died: June 1, 1818 (aged 56) Newport, Rhode Island, U.S.
- Spouse: Sarah Wallace Alexander (m. 1784)
- Relations: William Butler (son-in-law); George Washington Rodgers (grandson)
- Children: 8, including Matthew, Oliver
- Parent(s): James Freeman Perry; Mercy Hazard

Military service
- Allegiance: United States
- Branch/service: United States Navy
- Years of service: 1775–1783; 1798–1801
- Rank: Captain
- Commands: USS General Greene
- Battles/wars: American Revolution; Quasi War

Christopher Raymond Perry (December 4, 1761 – June 1, 1818) was a United States Navy officer and judge who was appointed Chief Justice of the Court of Common Pleas for Washington County, Rhode Island, in 1780 and served until 1791. He was the father of Oliver Hazard Perry and Matthew Calbraith Perry.

== Early life ==
Perry was born on December 4, 1761, in Newport, Rhode Island, the son of the Hon. James Freeman Perry (1732–1813) and his wife, Mercy Hazard (1739–1810). Christopher's father, Freeman, was a physician and surgeon.

Perry's paternal great-grandfather, Edward Perry, came from Devon, England, in 1637 and settled in Sandwich, Massachusetts, where he married his wife, Mary Freeman, in 1653. On his mother's side Perry was a seventh-generation descendant of Captain Richard Raymond (1602–1692), and his wife, Julia, who was likely born in Essex, England, in 1602 and arrived in Salem, Massachusetts, about 1629, possibly with a contingent led by the Rev. Francis Higginson. He was about 27 years old and went on to help found the community of Norwich, Connecticut, and was also mentioned as an "honored fore-father of Saybrook".

Perry's mother was also a descendant of Governor Thomas Prence (1599–1673), a co-founder of Eastham, Massachusetts, who was a political leader in both the Plymouth Colony and Massachusetts Bay Colony, and served as governor of the former; and a descendant of two Mayflower passengers, both of whom were signers of the Mayflower Compact, Elder William Brewster (c. 1567–1644), the Pilgrim colonist leader and spiritual elder of the Plymouth Colony, and George Soule (1593–1679). Christopher Perry was also descended from Soule through his paternal grandmother Susannah Barber Perry (1697–1755).

== American Revolution ==
At the age of 14, Perry enlisted in a local militia company named the "Kingston Reds", early in the American Revolution. He was recruited to join the crew of a privateer commanded by a Captain Reed. After one cruise with Reed, Perry left him and signed on to the Mifflin commanded by George Wait Babcock. Mifflin was captured by the British and Perry was imprisoned on the notorious prison ship Jersey for three months before he managed to escape.

Following his escape, in 1779, Perry formally joined the Continental Navy as a seaman aboard the frigate USS Trumbull commanded by Captain James Nicholson. On June 1, 1780, Trumbull engaged the British privateer Watt in a hard-fought but inconclusive action in which Trumbull suffered 8 killed and 31 wounded compared to Watt, which suffered 13 killed and 79 wounded.

Unhappy with his low pay, Perry returned to privateering but was subsequently captured by the British off the coast of Great Britain in 1782. He then was imprisoned in the Newry Barracks in Ireland where he met his future wife, Sarah Wallace Alexander. Perry managed another escape by pretending to be a British sailor and taking passage to St. Thomas in the Virgin Islands. From St. Thomas he took passage to Charleston, South Carolina, shortly before the war's conclusion in 1783.

=== Post war ===
After the war, Perry served as a mate on a merchantman bound for Ireland, enabling him to bring his beloved Sarah to the United States on the return voyage. They were married in Philadelphia on August 2, 1784. The young couple then moved to South Kingstown, Rhode Island, where they lived with Perry's parents on their 200-acre estate. Their first child, Oliver Hazard Perry, was born in August 1785.

Perry subsequently went into business as a merchant captain, making voyages all over the world and amassing a small fortune in the process. He then decided to move his family to Newport, which was then an important shipping center and one of the largest cities in the newly independent United States. By 1797, Perry had achieved enough financial security that he was able to retire to the small coastal town of Westerly in the southwest corner of Rhode Island.

== Quasi War ==
On January 7, 1798, during the Quasi-War with France, Perry was commissioned into the United States Navy at the rank of captain, commanding the frigate General Greene, on which his 13-year old son Oliver served as a midshipman. General Greene was launched on January 21, 1799 and departed on her first cruise on June 2, escorting five US merchantmen to Havana, Cuba. In Havana, a yellow fever epidemic spread to the ship and she was forced to return home early on July 27. General Greene departed on her second cruise to Saint-Domingue on September 23. On December 1, she assisted the USS Boston in rescuing the captured Danish schooner Flyvende fisk and an American schooner, Weymouth. Among other duties, General Green participated in the War of the South, intercepting supplies intended for the troops of André Rigaud, who was fighting against Toussaint Louverture.

On April 27, General Greene brought two emissaries sent by Louverture to New Orleans where they went on to meet with President John Adams. She left New Orleans on May 10, escorting twelve US merchantmen to Havana. General Greene returned to Newport on July 21, where most of her crew was discharged. Perry was given orders to maintain General Greene in a high state of readiness, should her services be needed.

However, a Naval Court of Inquiry was arranged when Perry's officers reported several accusations, including that Perry had permitted a lapse in shipboard discipline. Following the inquiry, Adams ordered Secretary of the Navy Benjamin Stoddert to suspend Perry from the Navy for three months without pay in a letter on 28 November. A new captain, Hugh G. Campbell, was ordered to assume command of General Greene on the same day. Although the three months passed without incident, Perry would never hold a command in the Navy again.

Perry was officially discharged from Navy service by the Peace Establishment Act of April 3, 1801, which greatly reduced the size of both the Army and the Navy. In the Navy, only nine of 42 active captains were not discharged.

== Personal life ==
On August 2, 1784, Perry married Sarah Wallace Alexander (1768–1830) in Philadelphia, Pennsylvania. She was born about 1768 in County Down, Ireland and died December 4, 1830, in New London, Connecticut. She was a descendant of an uncle of William Wallace, the Scottish knight and landowner who is known for leading a resistance during the Wars of Scottish Independence and is today remembered as a patriot and national hero.

Christopher and Sarah had five sons, all of whom were officers in the U.S. Navy who died in service, and three daughters:

- Commodore Oliver Hazard Perry (1785–1819), who married Elizabeth Champlin Mason in 1811.
- Lieutenant Raymond Henry Jones Perry (1789–1826), who married Mary Ann DeWolf (1795-1834). He served in the U.S. Navy from 1807 until his death.
- Sarah Wallace Perry (1791–1855), who never married.
- Commodore Matthew Calbraith Perry (1794–1858), who married Jane Slidell Perry (1816–1864)
- Anna Maria Perry (1797–1858), who married Commodore George Washington Rodgers (1787–1832).
- Jane Tweedy Perry (1799–1875), who married William Butler Jr. (1790–1850), a surgeon and United States Congressman, in 1819.
- Lieutenant James Alexander Perry (1801–1822), who served in the U.S. Navy from 1811 until his death. Served with his brother Oliver at the Battle of Lake Erie at the age of 12.
- Purser Nathaniel Hazard Perry (1803–1832), who served as a purser (i.e., a supply and pay officer) in the U.S. Navy from 1820 until his death.

In 1800, Perry became the owner of a large house at 31 Walnut Street in Newport which is today known as the Knowles-Perry House. It is probable that this was Perry's primary residence for the remainder of his life.

Captain Perry died in Newport in 1818 and is buried in the Belmont-Perry plot in the Island Cemetery in Newport, Rhode Island. Aside from his wife, all those buried in the plot are either his descendants or their spouses.

=== Descendants ===
Captain Christopher Raymond Perry's descendants number in the thousands today. Some of his notable descendants include:

His eldest son, Oliver Hazard Perry (1785–1819), hero of the Battle of Lake Erie. Matthew Calbraith Perry, commander of the Perry Expedition to Japan. Brevet Brigadier General Alexander James Perry (1828–1913) was a career Army officer who graduated from West Point and served during the American Civil War. The Right Reverend James De Wolf Perry (1871–1947) served as Episcopal Bishop of Rhode Island and Presiding Bishop of the Episcopal Church.

Captain Perry's grandson, Rear Admiral Christopher Raymond Perry Rodgers (1819–1892) was an officer in the United States Navy who served in the Mexican–American War and the American Civil War, was Superintendent of the Naval Academy, and Commander-in-Chief of the Pacific Squadron. Rear Admiral Raymond Perry Rodgers (1849–1925), son of C.R.P. Rodgers, was an officer in the United States Navy and the second head of the Office of Naval Intelligence. Raymond Perry Rodgers's younger brother, Rear Admiral Thomas S. Rodgers (1858–1931), was an officer in the United States Navy who served in the Spanish–American War and World War I. Two other descendants of Captain Perry through his daughter Anna Maria Perry Rodgers were Calbraith Perry Rodgers (1879–1912), a pioneer American aviator who was the first civilian to purchase a Wright Flyer and the first to make a transcontinental flight, and Commander John Rodgers (1881–1926), an officer in the United States Navy and an early aviator.

Through his son Matthew's daughter, Caroline Slidell (née Perry) Belmont, he was the great-grandfather of statesman Perry Belmont (1851–1947), who served as a United States representative from New York and the United States minister to Spain, and also served as an officer in the U.S. Army during both the Spanish–American War and World War I. August Belmont Jr. (1853–1924), was an American financier, the builder of New York's Belmont Park racetrack, and a major owner/breeder of Thoroughbred racehorses. Oliver Hazard Perry Belmont (1858–1908) was a wealthy American socialite and United States Representative from New York; he was the second husband of Alva Vanderbilt Belmont.

Another of Captain Perry's great-grandsons, William Tiffany (1868–1898), a 2nd lieutenant in the 1st United States Volunteer Cavalry (a.k.a. Roosevelt's Rough Riders), died of yellow fever shortly after returning to the United States following his service in Cuba during the Spanish–American War. Matthew Calbraith Butler (1836–1909), son of Captain Perry's daughter Jane Tweedy Perry Butler, was an American military commander and politician from South Carolina who served as a major general in the Confederate States Army during the American Civil War, a post-bellum three-term United States Senator, and a major general in the United States Army during the Spanish–American War. Commander George Washington Rodgers (1822–1863), a grandson of Captain Perry and brother of Rear Admiral C.R.P. Rodgers, "was distinguished for his bravery in the silencing of Fort Sumter and the batteries on Morris Island."
