= Raymond P. R. Neilson =

American painter

Raymond Perry Rodgers Neilson (1881 – March 1, 1964) was an American painter.

== Early life and education ==
Neilson was born in New York into a naval family, the grandson of Rear Admiral Christopher Raymond Perry Rodgers. He graduated from the United States Naval Academy in 1905, before joining the Navy. After suffering from ill health, he resigned in 1908 and began to study painting.

After re-joining the Navy in World War I and serving in London, Neilson began study at Boston's School of the Museum of Fine Arts in 1916. He then studied under William Merritt Chase at the Art Students League of New York. Once the war had finished, he studied at the Académie Julian under Jean-Paul Laurens, while also studying at the Ecole des Beaux Arts, Académie de la Grande Chaumière, and the Académie Colarossi.

== Teaching career ==
Neilson taught at the Art Students League from 1926 to 1927, before becoming an instructor at the National Academy of Design from 1927 to 1934. After he stopped teaching, he served as the Academy's council from 1937 to 1946.

== Personal life ==
Neilson was married to Mary Park Neilson, a prominent socialite in Santa Barbara and New York. She filed for divorce in April 1924, arguing that he had failed to provide for her while he studied in Paris.

He died on March 1, 1964, at his apartment in New York.

== Awards ==
- National Academy of Design's Isaac N. Maynard Prize
