= USS Firefly =

United States navy brig

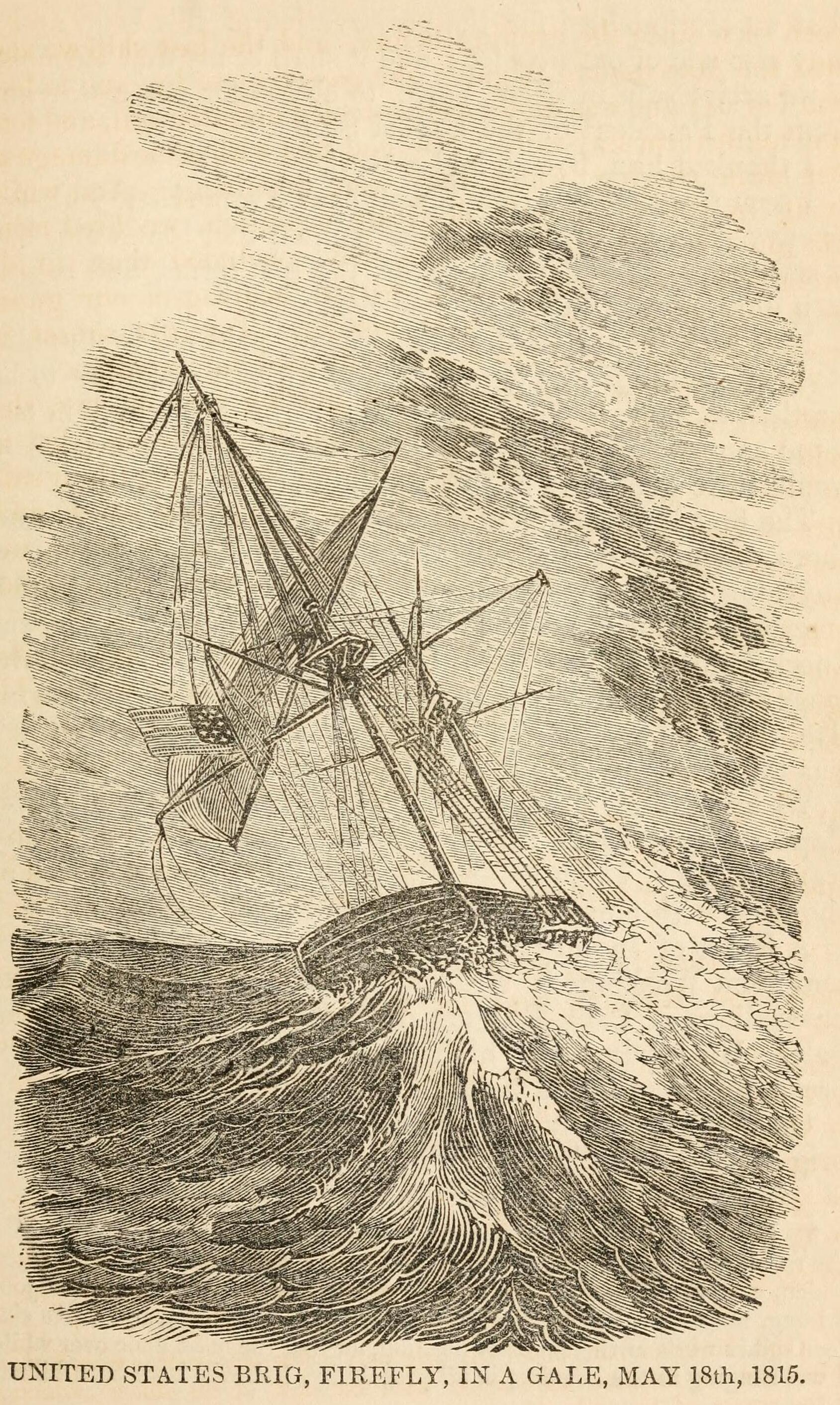
- 1857 depiction of the Firefly

History

United States
- Name: Volant
- Builder: Baltimore, Maryland
- Acquired: 8 Dec 1814
- Renamed: USS Firefly
- Fate: Sold at New York, 3 April 1816

General characteristics
- Type: Brig
- Tons burthen: 333 (bm)
- Length: Overall: 109 ft (33 m); Keel: 100 ft (30 m)
- Beam: 29 ft 4 in (8.94 m)
- Draft: 11 ft 6 in (3.51 m)
- Complement: 100
- Armament: 1812: 4× 18-pounder guns + 10 × 18-pounder carronades; 1816:4 × 12-pounder guns + 12 × 18-pounder carronades

The USS Firefly was a brig with two masts, square-rigged, formerly named Volant and originally built as a schooner for use as a privateer. The U.S. Navy purchased Volant on 8 December 1814 at New York by and was fitted her out as US naval 14-gun brig. She served during the War of 1812 and the Second Barbary War of 1815. Firefly was purchased because of the several US blockade efforts where smaller ships with better maneuverability were needed for the task. The Navy sold her in 1816 and she became a Portuguese slave ship.

== History ==
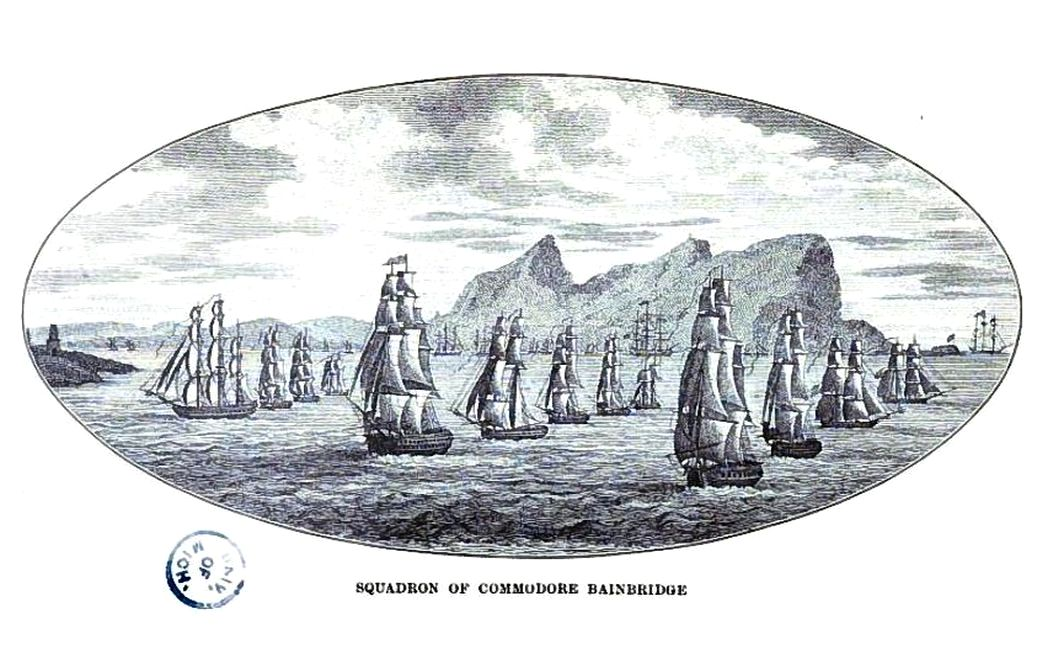
Bainbridge Squadron off Algiers

In 1814, during the War of 1812, Firefly became the flagship of a squadron of five small ships (Firefly, Spark, Flambeau, Spitfire, Torch) which were preparing for a mission to the West Indies to capture or destroy enemy commerce. However the mission was canceled when a peace treaty with Britain was signed on 24 December.

On 20 May 1815, during the Second Barbary War, command of the Firefly was given to Lieutenant George W. Rodgers who departed from New York for the Mediterranean to join the squadron of Commodore Stephen Decatur. After a few days at sea Rodgers' squadron encountered a heavy gale and Firefly sprung a mast, forcing her to return to port for repairs.

After repairs were completed Firefly set sail again for the Mediterranean on 18 July where she joined Commodore William Bainbridge's and Decatur's squadrons at Carthagena where preparations for the mission at Algiers were being made. From there the squadrons sailed to Algiers and spend the next several months maintaining the blockade and enforcing the peace concluded with the Dey of Algiers by Commodore Decatur and William Shaler, US Consul to Algiers.

On 15 November 1815 Firefly arrived with the squadron at Newport, R.I., then sailed on to New York where she was laid up at the navy yard. She was sold at public auction on 3 April 1816 at New York.

She apparently became the slaver Africano, or San Francisco de Paula.

== See also ==
- List of schooners
- Piracy in the Caribbean
- West Indies Anti-Piracy Operations of the United States
