= USS General Greene (1799) =

History

United States
- Name: USS General Greene
- Namesake: Nathanael Greene
- Builder: Benjamin Talman and James DeWolf
- Cost: $105,492
- Launched: 21 January 1799
- Commissioned: 2 June 1799
- Fate: Burned, 24 August 1814

General characteristics
- Type: Frigate
- Tonnage: tonnage 654
- Length: 124 ft 3 in (37.87 m)
- Beam: 34 ft 8 in (10.57 m)
- Draft: 17 ft 4 in (5.28 m)
- Propulsion: Sail
- Complement: 220 or 250 officers and enlisted
- Armament: 24 × 12-pounder guns; 6 × 6-pounder guns

USS General Greene was a 30-gun frigate of the United States Navy launched in 1799 during the Quasi-War with France. Named after Continental Army major general Nathanael Greene, she was built under government contract by Benjamin Talman and James DeWolf at Warren, Rhode Island. Launched on January 1799, the frigate was placed under command of Captain Christopher Raymond Perry. Perry's son, young midshipman Oliver Hazard Perry, was assigned to his father's ship.

General Greene sailed on 2 June 1799, joining the Governor Jay in convoying five merchantmen to Havana. Damage suffered in a heavy gale caused her to put in at Havana for repairs, and her crew was struck with yellow fever. More than 20 died and the frigate returned to Newport, Rhode Island, on 27 July with 37 men in various stages of recovery. After a thorough cleaning, fumigation, and change of ballast, she departed Newport on 23 September 1799 to take station at Cap‑Français, Saint-Domingue.

General Greene remained off San Domingo for the following six months. In company with USS Boston, on 1 December 1799 she assisted in the recapture of the Danish brig "Flying Fish", captured by André Rigaud's barges, but with questionable crewing and other oddities (possibly French owned) and retook the American schooner Weymouth, which had been captured by French privateer Hope. Much of her time was spent watching over the rebellion against General Toussaint in Haiti. She blockaded the port of Jacmel to cut off supplies of the rebels, and gave direct gunfire support to General Toussaint's army in the capture of Jacmel on 27 February 1800. On 2 March, 1800 she detained Danish schooner "William and Mary" and allowed her capture by one of General Toussaint's barges later in the day.

On 11 March she captured an unknown French privateer schooner off Jackmel. Some time before 4 April she captured 2 prizes. One of the prizes was schooner "General Toussaint", which Captain Silas Talbot ordered released. She remained at Jacmel as a possible haven for American citizens until 27 April, when she sailed with two representatives sent by General Toussaint for an audience with the President of the United States, John Adams. Stopping at New Orleans, she embarked General James Wilkinson and his family for transport home. General Greene then proceeded as escort for 12 merchantmen bound to Havana, arriving there 22 June. She departed Havana 26 June escorting a convoy of 12 merchantmen. She finally returned to Newport, arriving on 21 July 1800.

General Greene's crew was discharged and the frigate remained idle at Newport, until Captain Perry was retired under the Peace Establishment Act of 3 April 1801. Capt. Richard Derby was ordered to take command in a letter written 2 September, 1800, repealed 8 September. A Court of Enquiry was held on various lapses in obeying Orders and other conduct during the last deployment. Following the enquiry President John Adams ordered Secretary of the Navy Benjamin Stoddart to suspend Perry from the Service for 3 months without pay. Capt. Hugh G. Campbell was ordered to assume command in a letter dated 28 November. after which she was laid up in ordinary at the Washington Navy Yard.

On July 21, 1801, Lieutenant Isaac Chauncey was ordered to take command of General Greene for an anticipated deployment to the Mediterranean as part of the First Barbary War. However, on August 13 the order was rescinded and her crew transferred to USS New York. On November 19, 1802, Midshipman George S. Hackley was ordered to take command of her as sailing master. On March 16, 1803, she was ordered to serve as a hospital ship for the frigate USS Constellation. On November 14, orders were issued to put her in complete repair. She was reduced to a sheer hulk in 1805, and General Greene was scuttled by burning on August 24, 1814 when British troops occupied Washington during the War of 1812.
