= Willard F. Jones =

American naval architect, business executive and philanthropist

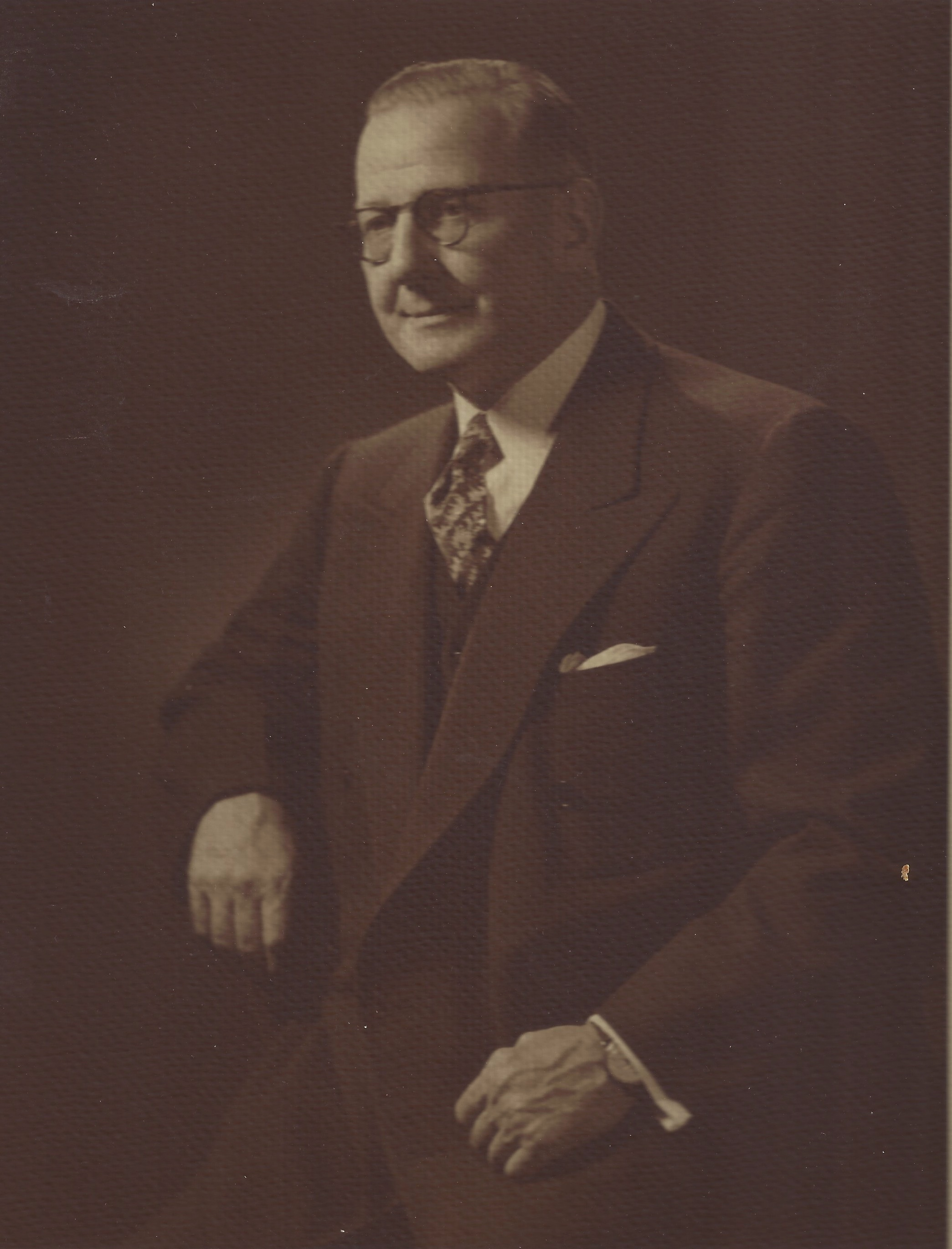
- Jones in 1957
- Born: February 27, 1890; New York City, US
- Died: August 18, 1967 (aged 77); White Plains, New York, US
- Resting place: Green-Wood Cemetery, Brooklyn, New York, US
- Other name: W.F.J.
- Education: Cooper Union (BE); Columbia University; Harvard University (MBA)
- Occupations: Naval architect; businessman
- Employer: Gulf Oil
- Spouse: Ruth Black (m. 1916; died 1964)
- Children: 2

Signature
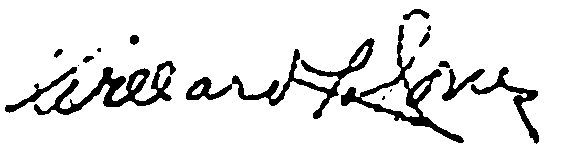

Willard F. Jones I (February 27, 1890 – August 18, 1967) was an American naval architect, business executive, and philanthropist. He served as a general manager and Vice President of the Gulf Oil corporation during the late 1930s, 1940s, and 1950s. Jones was one of the instrumental figures in establishing effective transport of crude oil from Venezuela, the Persian Gulf and Kuwait to the United States in the first half of the 20th century.

== Early life and education ==
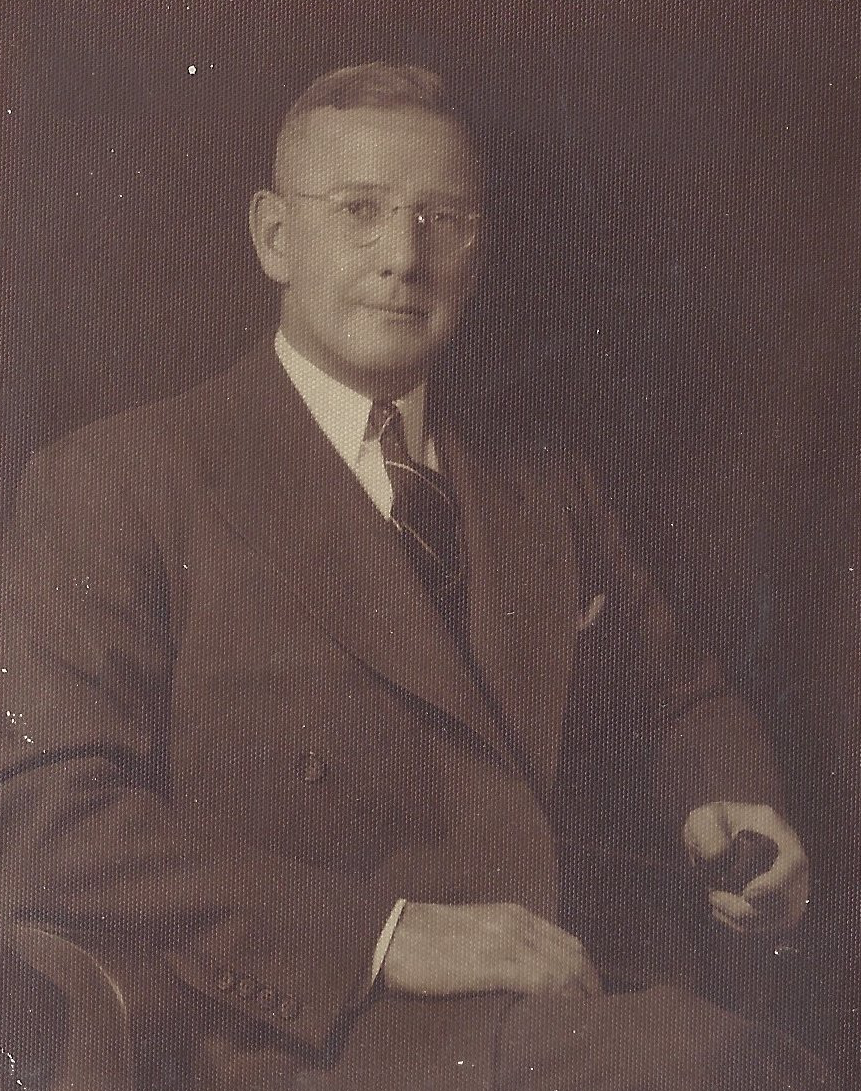
Willard F. Jones in the 1920s

Jones was born to William F. Jones I and Mary Ellen Jones (née Shannon) on February 27, 1890, in New York. His father was a shipping agent of Anglo-Welsh descent, and his mother was of Irish descent. He had three younger siblings: Helen, Herbert, and Mary. Jones began his career as deck boy aboard the Northeastern, a tanker under charter to the J.M. Guffey Petroleum Company, which was a forerunner to Gulf Oil. By the age of 20, he had ascended up the hierarchy of the company and was employed as an oil transport purchasing agent. Jones graduated from the Cooper Union with a bachelor's degree in Mechanical Engineering and went on to receive additional graduate education at both Columbia School of Mines and Harvard Business School.

== Career ==
Willard F. Jones delivers a speech at the reception of the launch of the S.S. San Tome from Sparrow's Point, Maryland on November 16, 1949

After completing his schooling from Cooper Union, in 1913 Jones was placed in charge of Gulf Oil's Marine Department purchasing and small boat operations in New York Harbor. Five years later, in 1918, he was promoted to Assistant Marine Superintendent for the company and became a member of the Society of Naval Architects and Marine Engineers; in 1929 he became Marine Superintendent of Gulf Oil.

Jones established himself as a prominent marine engineer and naval architect who designed large scale oil tankers for the Gulf Oil corporation over several decades. He worked for Gulf Oil for fifty-two years in total, the longest service of any employee in the company's history. He became general manager of Gulf Oil in 1936 and a Vice President in 1949. Jones retired from this latter position in 1955.

While serving as general manager and Vice President of Gulf Oil, Jones facilitated the expansion of crude oil import from Kuwait, a nation that was – at the time – a yet incipient supply region to the United States. This expansion program implemented by Robert E. Garret and Jones consisted of construction of a fleet of supertankers and was meant to "result in a sharp increase in the processing of crude oil and various petroleum products at a time when the domestic demand for (such) products (was) at an unprecedented peak.". Jones also focused on the efficiency of foreign oil import into the United States, and lobbied to Robert Sikes in the House of Representatives on behalf of expanded and more expedient entry into the Port St. Joe channel in Florida in the aftermath of the Second World War, which at that time, represented the eastern terminus of the southeastern pipeline of the United States.

Jones held other numerous ancillary leadership positions apart from his Gulf Oil concern. During World War II, he served as chairman of the American Committee of Lloyd's Register of Shipping. Jones was also the General Chairman of the National Safety Council's Marine Section of 1947–1948, chairman of the tanker committee of the American Petroleum Institute, a director of the American Merchant Marine Institute, and was elected president of the Propeller Club in 1955.

== Personal life, death, and legacy ==
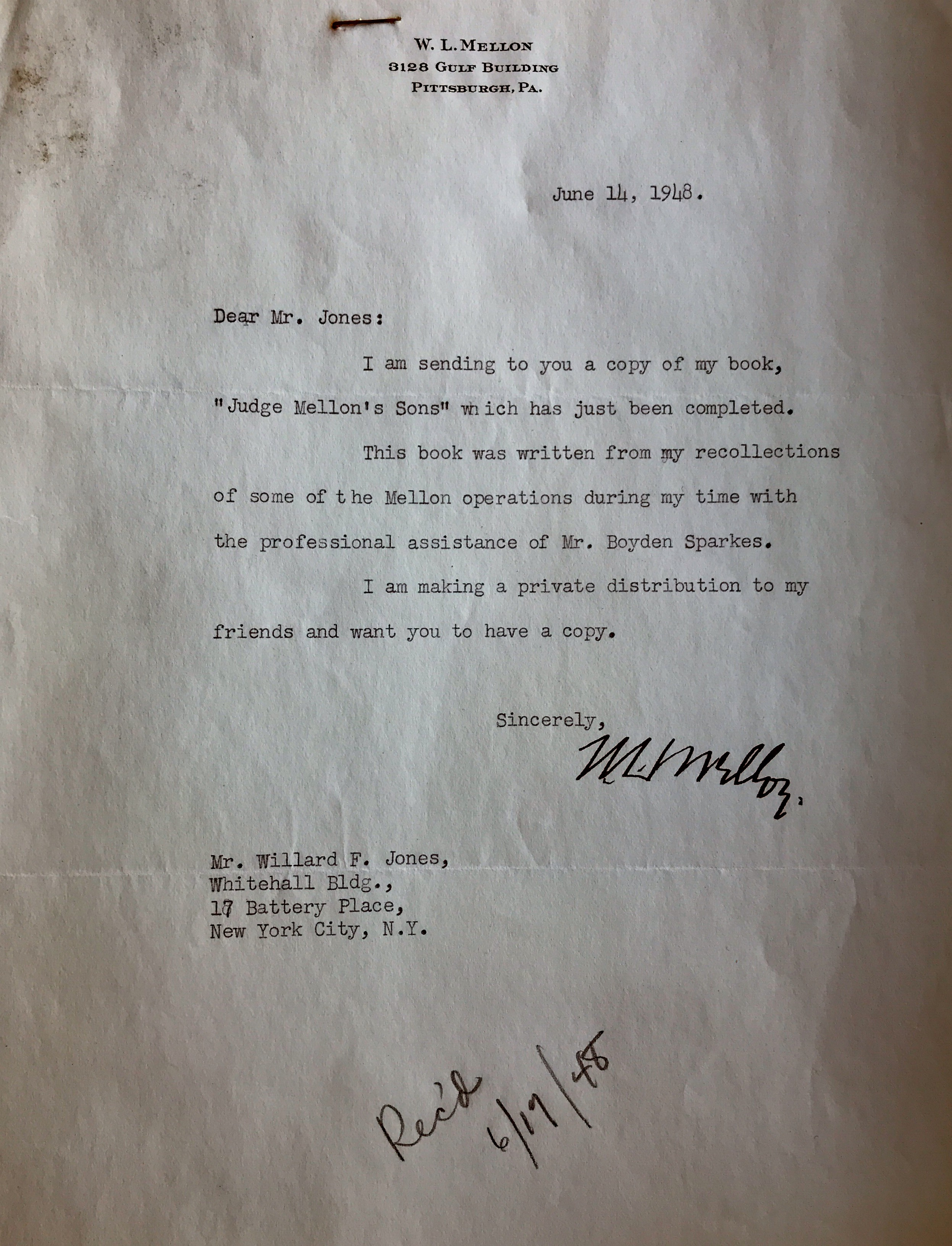
William Larimer Mellon Sr. letter to Willard F. Jones, June 14, 1948

Jones married Ruth Black in 1916; she was a scion of both the famous Perry and Rodgers naval family dynasties. With his wife, Jones had two sons: Willard E. Jones USN and Lloyd P. Jones. They resided in Clearwater, Florida, and Bethlehem, Pennsylvania, respectively.

In 1955, Jones provided the passage to and from Venezuela for Bassett Maguire in his landmark trip to further explore the Guyana Highlands mountain ranges of the Amazonian basin, in which the sandstone massif Cerro de la Neblina was discovered.

Jones was a personal friend of Gulf Oil's founder William Larimer Mellon Sr., and the two maintained a direct correspondence until the latter's death in 1949.

At the time of his retirement from Gulf Oil, Jones was considered "one of the most widely experienced Marine executives in the United States." He continued to pursue consulting work in the field of naval architecture and shipping following his retirement. Jones died on August 18, 1967, at the White Plains Hospital in Westchester County, New York. His Requiem Mass was held at St. Anselm's Roman Catholic Church in Brooklyn. Jones was interred in Brooklyn's Green-Wood Cemetery alongside his wife's grave, and amidst her family.

== See also ==
- List of alumni of Cooper Union
- Perry family
