= Theodorus B. M. Mason =

- Born: Theodorus Bailey Myers Mason; May 8, 1848
- Died: October 15, 1899 (aged 51); Saugerties, New York, US
- Burial place: Green-Wood Cemetery
- Military career
- Allegiance: United States of America
- Branch: United States Navy
- Service years: 1864–94
- Rank: Lieutenant commander
- Units: USS Guerriere, USS Pensacola, USS Macedonian, USS Savannah, USS Dale, USS Essex, USS Trenton, USS Brooklyn, USS New York
- Commands: Office of Naval Intelligence
- Conflicts: American Civil War
- Awards: Order of the Rose

Theodorus Bailey Myers Mason (May 8, 1848 – October 15, 1899) was the founder and first head of the United States Office of Naval Intelligence, with the post of Chief Intelligence Officer (prior to it being redesignated as Director of Naval Intelligence in 1911).

== Biography ==
Mason came from a distinguished New York family. He was the son of Theodorus Bailey Myers, who was a lawyer and served as a colonel in the United States Army during the Civil War; his uncle, Rear Adm. Theodorus Bailey, served under Admiral David Farragut in New Orleans. He adopted the last name Mason in deference to his maternal grandfather Sidney Mason, who had no male heirs to carry on the family name.

A graduate of the United States Naval Academy in 1868, Mason was a distinguished linguist with an inquisitive mind, qualities that gave him respect and recognition in the Navy. After a stint in the Hydrographic Office, he travelled extensively in Europe and South America as a naval observer collecting ideas on naval intelligence systems; he knew what information was available and how to obtain it. He recognized that in order for the Navy to compete with its European counterparts, research in naval science and technology should be encouraged; as part of this objective, a unified intelligence agency was needed to gather information on foreign developments for proper dissemination and coordination with the different Bureaus. He made these recommendations upon the request of Secretary of the Navy William H. Hunt.

Hunt read and agreed with most of Lt. Mason's recommendations, and consequently issued General Order No. 292 on March 23, 1882, establishing the Office of Naval Intelligence as part of the Bureau of Navigation, with Mason himself as its first "Chief Intelligence Officer". He assumed this post in June 1882. The Office was initially assigned to a small office in the State, War and Navy Building (now the Old Executive Office Building).

Despite initial difficulties, the different Bureaus recognized its value and used it to share information amongst themselves and used this information in justifying funds needed for Navy expansion and modernization.

Mason clearly guided the ONI well during its first years, and was succeeded by Lt. Raymond P. Rodgers in April 1885. He was promoted to lieutenant commander in January 1894, and retired from the Navy in December due to ill health. He died in Saugerties on 15 October 1899 and was interred in the Mason family mausoleum at the Green-Wood Cemetery in Brooklyn, NY.

In The War of the Pacific Coast of South America Between Chile and the Allied Republics of Peru and Bolivia, Mason wrote one such account in which he described the belligerents of the Atacama border dispute. As stated above, he was resourceful and reports that the material used for the paper was derived from personal observation, from apparently authentic publications, and from other Naval officers within the region at the time of the conflict. Mason's work is a chronology of events leading up to, during, and the outcome of the War of the Pacific.

== Personal life ==
In 1875, Mason married Edmonia Taylor Phelps (February 1, 1858 – July 10, 1909), daughter of Rear Admiral Thomas S. Phelps.

Preceded by None	Head of the Office of Naval Intelligence (Chief Intelligence Officer); June 1882 – April 1885	Succeeded by Raymond P. Rodgers
