= Theodorus Bailey Myers =

American lawyer

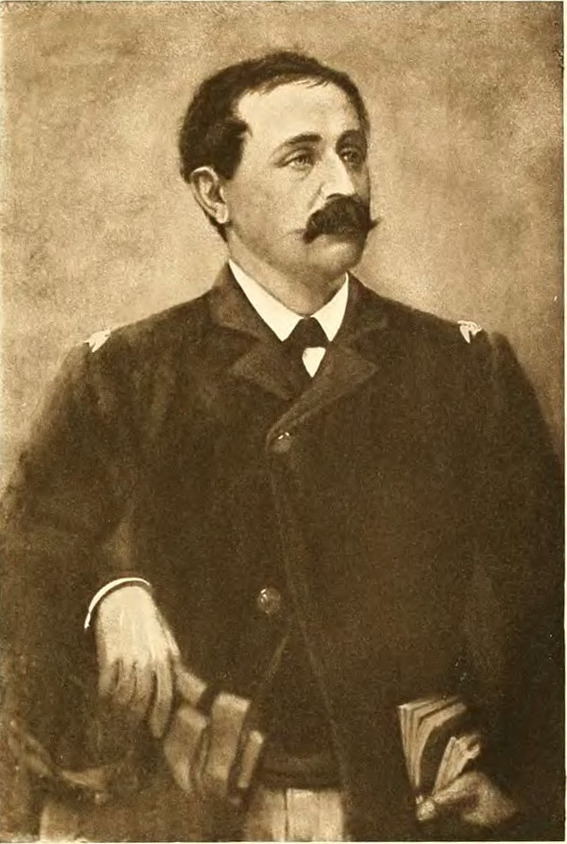
- Born: December 13, 1821
- Died: June 16, 1888
- Resting place: Green-Wood Cemetery
- Spouse: Catalina Juliana Mason
- Children: 2, including Theodorus B. M. Mason
- Father: Mordecai Myers
- Relatives: Algernon Sydney Myers

Theodorus Bailey Myers (December 13, 1821 – June 16, 1888), was an American lawyer, philanthropist, served as a colonel in the U.S. Military, and a collector of books and historical manuscripts.

== Biography ==
Myers was born to Major Mordecai Myers (who received his title during the War of 1812) and Charlotte Bailey, niece of politician Theodorus Bailey and sister of naval officer Theodorus Bailey. His father was Jewish. Myers was likely named for these two familial influences. He studied law at Kinderhook Academy and was conferred his degree in 1842.

Myers was involved with many scientific and social organizations. He was a founding fellow of the American Geographical Society, member of the New York Yacht Club, Century Club, Union Club of the City of New York, and a Commissioner of the New York City Fire Department. He also served on the Boards of Managers for the New York Institution for the Blind and the Women's Hospital, where he developed a friendship with fellow collector of Americana, Dr. Thomas Addis Emmet, who would posthumously organize Myers' manuscripts.

At the outbreak of the Civil War, Myers served as quartermaster of the Baltic with the New York 12th Regiment. He also served on the military staff of General Butler and later, General Wool.

He died on June 16, 1888, and was interred at Green-Wood Cemetery.

== Legacy ==
During his lifetime, Colonel Myers wrote many brochures on topics of American history. Among his collection is a complete set of autographs of the signers of the Declaration of Independence, the letters of which he published as a special issue of Historical magazine. Upon his death, Myers had amassed a library of about 1600 documents, 3000 printed books, and 1600 pamphlets. His collection was donated to The New York Public Library by his widow, daughter, and daughter-in-law, in 1899. Colonel Myers' collection of weapons, as well as that of his son, Theodorus Bailey Myers Mason were donated to the United States National Museum.
