= George Washington Rodgers (1787–1832) =

American naval officer (1787–1832)

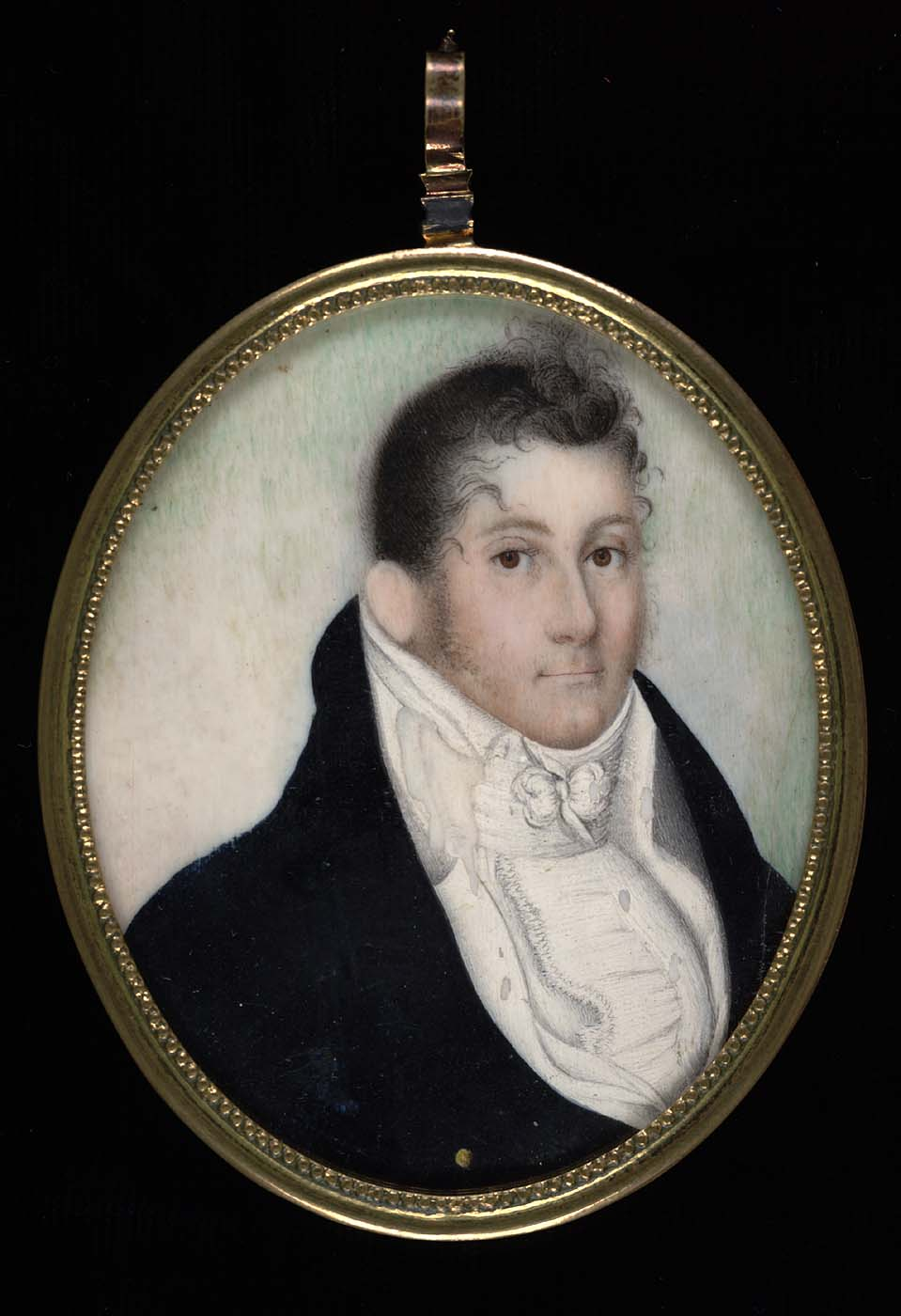
- Born: 22 February 1787
- Died: 21 May 1832
- Children: George Washington Rodgers
- Father: Commodore John Rodgers, USN
- Relatives: John Rodgers

George Washington Rodgers (February 22, 1787 – May 21, 1832) was an American naval officer.

== Biography ==
George Washington Rodgers was born in Harford County, Maryland, on February 22, 1787; a brother of Commodore John Rodgers. His father was an officer in the American Revolution. He was warranted a midshipman in the U.S. Navy, April 2, 1804; was promoted lieutenant, April 24, 1810, and assigned to duty on the sloop Wasp being present at the engagement between the Wasp and the Frolic, Oct. 18, 1812. He was included in the vote of thanks passed by Congress, and received a silver medal. He was married to Anna Maria, daughter of Christopher Raymond and Sarah (Alexander) Perry. He was given command of the brig Firefly in the war with Algiers in 1815; was commissioned master-commandant, April 27, 1816, and assigned to the command of the ship Peacock in the Mediterranean, 1816-18. He was promoted captain, March 3, 1825; was a member of the board of examiners, 1828–30, and was promoted commodore and commanded the Brazil squadron, 1830-32. He died in Buenos Aires, May 21, 1832.
