= Christopher Raymond Perry Rodgers =

United States Navy officer (1819–1892)

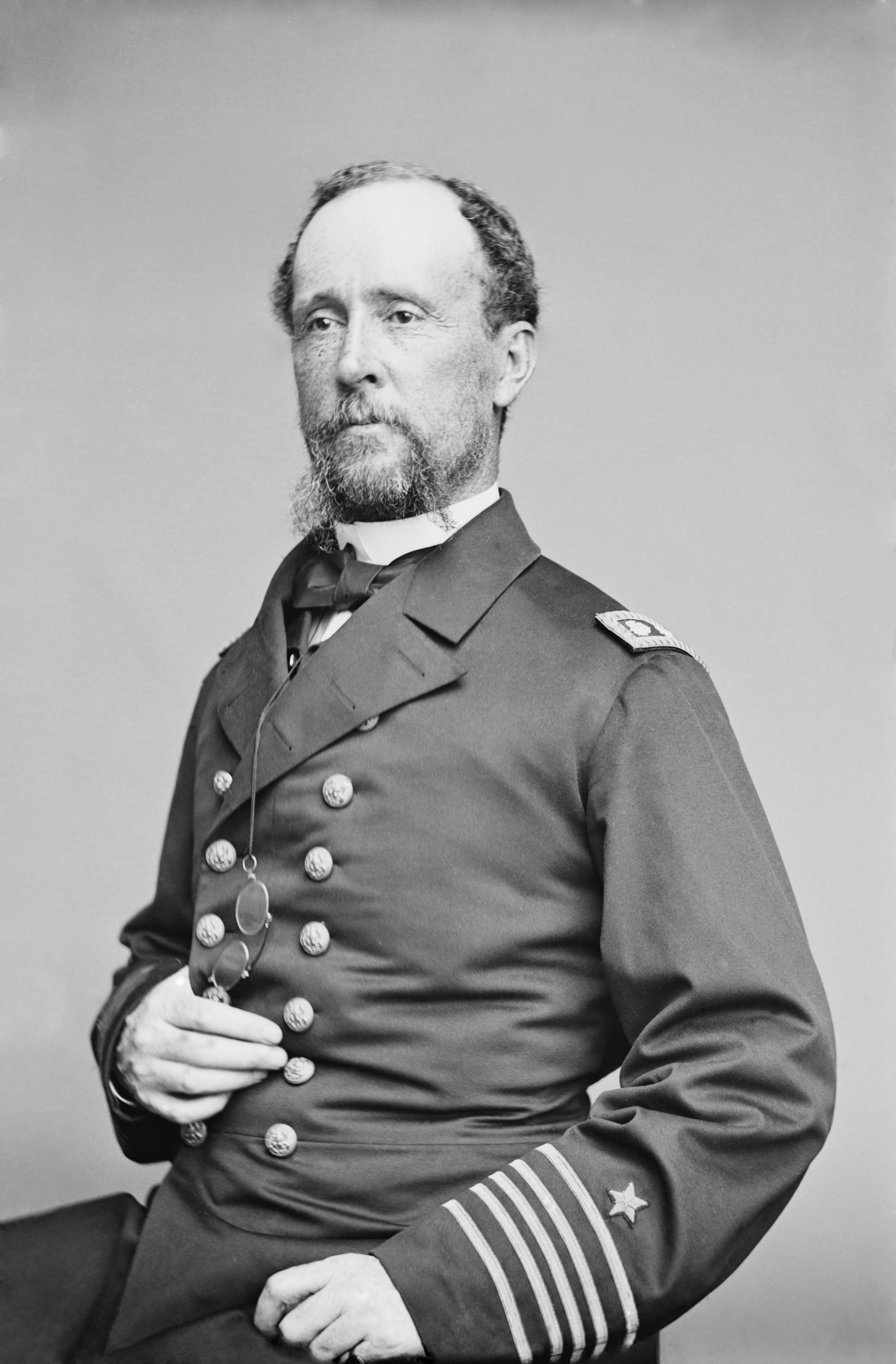
- Born: November 4, 1819; Brooklyn, New York, US
- Died: January 8, 1892 (aged 72); Washington, D.C., US
- Burial place: Arlington National Cemetery
- Relatives: John Rodgers (uncle); Christopher R. Perry (grandfather); John Rodgers (cousin); Oliver Hazard Perry (uncle); Matthew C. Perry (uncle); George W. Rodgers (brother); Thomas S. Rodgers (son); Raymond P. Rodgers (son)
- Military career
- Allegiance: United States of America
- Branch: United States Navy
- Service years: 1833–1881
- Rank: Rear admiral
- Commands: USS Phoenix; USS Wabash; USS New Ironsides; USS Iroquois; USS Franklin; Pacific Squadron
- Conflicts: Second Seminole War; Mexican–American War; American Civil War

Rear Admiral Christopher Raymond Perry Rodgers (4 November 1819 – 8 January 1892) was an officer in the United States Navy. He served in the Mexican–American War, the American Civil War, as superintendent of the Naval Academy, president of the United States Naval Institute, and commander-in-chief of the Pacific Squadron.

== Biography ==
=== Background ===
Rodgers was born on 4 November 1819 in Brooklyn, New York, into a naval family. His father, George Washington Rodgers, was a Navy captain, who had commanded the brig Firefly during the War of 1812, and the brother of Commodore John Rodgers. Through his mother, Anna Maria Perry, his maternal grandfather was Captain Christopher Raymond Perry, and his uncles were the Commodores Oliver Hazard and Matthew Calbraith Perry. His family background all but ensured that both C.R.P. Rodgers and his younger brother George Washington Rodgers Jr., would join the Navy.

=== Early career ===
Rodgers was appointed midshipman on 5 October 1833, serving aboard the frigate Brandywine in the Pacific Squadron in 1834–35, then in the sloop Vincennes on the same station in 1836. He was stationed at the New York Navy Yard from 1837, receiving promotion to passed midshipman on 8 July that year.

In 1839–40 Rodgers served aboard the schooner Flirt on the coast of Florida, taking part in operations during the Second Seminole War, and also briefly commanded the 2-gun schooner Phoenix.

Rodgers joined the Africa Squadron, serving aboard the sloop Saratoga in 1842–43. He then served on the frigate Cumberland, flagship of the Mediterranean Squadron, in 1844–45, and received promotion to lieutenant on 4 September 1844.

After being attached to the United States Coast Survey in 1846, Rodgers was assigned to the Home Squadron in 1847 in order to serve in the Mexican–American War. Rodgers participated in the Siege of Veracruz in March 1847, and in the capture of Tabasco and Tuxpan by his uncle Commodore Matthew C. Perry.

After the war Rodgers returned to the U.S. Coast Survey for three years, before serving aboard the screw sloop Congress on the Brazil Station in 1850–51. This was followed by duty as Flag Lieutenant aboard the Constitution with the Africa Squadron in 1852–55. He then spent another two years with the U.S. Coast Survey (1856–1858) before serving on the screw frigate Wabash, flagship of the Mediterranean Squadron, in 1858–1859.

=== Civil War ===
Rodgers was a Commandant of Midshipmen at the United States Naval Academy in 1859, serving there until after the start of the Civil War in 1861, and overseeing its relocation to Newport, Rhode Island, for the duration of the war. He was succeeded in the post by his brother George Washington Rodgers. He then served in Samuel F. Du Pont's South Atlantic Blockading Squadron, in command of the flagship Wabash, and distinguishing himself at the Battle of Port Royal, receiving promotion to commander directly afterwards, on 15 November 1861. On March 11, 1862, Rodgers was sent into St. Augustine to accept the surrender of the city after the defending Confederate troops had left it unguarded. Rodgers also saw action at the capture of Fort Pulaski in April 1862, before serving as captain of the flagship, the broadside ironclad New Ironsides at Charleston in 1863. Admiral Du Pont noted, "No language could overstate his services to his country and to myself." In March 1864 he recommissioned the screw sloop Iroquois, on an independent assignment to capture Confederate ships, which took him to the Mediterranean, and around South America and across the Pacific to Singapore in pursuit of the commerce raider CSS Shenandoah.

=== Post-war career ===
Rodgers was promoted to captain on 25 July 1866, and in 1867–68 commanded the screw frigate Franklin, flagship of Admiral David Farragut in the European Squadron. Promoted to commodore on 28 August 1870, he then served as Chief of the Bureau of Yards and Docks from 1871 to 1874. Achieving flag rank as a rear admiral on 14 June 1874, Rodgers served as superintendent of the Naval Academy from September 1874 until July 1878, before a two-year tour as commander of the Pacific Squadron, returning to the Naval Academy to serve as superintendent for a second time from June to November 1881. Rodgers also served as president of the United States Naval Institute from 1875 to 1877. He was put onto the retired list on 14 November 1881. He again became president of the U.S. Naval Institute in 1882.

Naval Academy accomplishments

While at the Academy Rodgers fostered careful and concrete reforms to help restore the navy's professional and institutional credibility in an era when the service suffered from institutional decay, public indifference, and relied on an antiquated wooden navy sporting canvas and smoothbore guns. By upgrading and rationalizing the academy's curriculum, especially in regard to the new four-year course for engineers, introducing the first mechanical engineering course in the country, concentrating professional subjects in the first- and second-class years, and adding upper-level electives in mathematics, mechanics, physics, and chemistry, Rodgers laid the groundwork for an American naval renaissance in the 1880s.

Rodgers was a member of the New York Commandery of the Military Order of the Loyal Legion of the United States and was assigned insignia number 571.

Rear Admiral Rodgers died in Washington, D.C. on 8 January 1892, and is buried in Arlington National Cemetery.

== Personal life ==
Rodgers married Julia Slidell, and had two sons follow him into Navy service, Raymond Perry Rodgers (1849–1925), and Thomas Slidell Rodgers (1858–1931), both of whom achieved the rank of rear admiral.

== See also ==
- List of superintendents of the United States Naval Academy
- Battle of Fort Pulaski

Academic offices
Preceded by John L. Worden	Superintendent of United States Naval Academy; 1874–1878	Succeeded by Foxhall A. Parker Jr.
Preceded by George B. Balch	Superintendent of United States Naval Academy; 1881	Succeeded by Francis Munroe Ramsay
