= USS Phoenix (1841) =

American Navy schooner

History

United States
- Name: USS Phoenix
- Namesake: Phoenix, a mythical bird
- Completed: 1841
- Commissioned: 1841
- Decommissioned: 1853
- Fate: Sold 1853

General characteristics
- Type: Schooner
- Tonnage: 90 tons
- Propulsion: Sails
- Armament: 2 guns

The second USS Phoenix was a schooner which served in the United States Navy from 1841 to 1853, seeing service in the Second Seminole War and the Mexican War.

Phoenix was constructed for the U.S. Navy at Baltimore, Maryland, in 1841. She departed Baltimore on 19 September 1841 with Passed Midshipman C. St. G. Noland as her commanding officer and sailed to the coast of Florida for operations against the Seminoles in the Second Seminole War. She continued this duty supporting operations of the "Mosquito Fleet" through the general pacification of the Seminoles in August 1842.

Phoenix arrived at Norfolk, Virginia on 18 October 1842. During the following two years she made three voyages to Panama. From 1846 to 1850, she served in the Gulf of Mexico conducting hydrographic surveys and providing general support to U.S. naval operations during the Mexican War and the peace which followed.

Phoenix returned to the United States East Coast in 1851 and served in the Atlantic Ocean until the Navy sold her in 1853.
