= Thomas S. Rodgers =

United States Navy admiral (1858–1931)

- Admiral Rodgers, center, coming aboard the Presidential yacht Mayflower, December, 1918.
- Born: August 18, 1858; Morristown, New Jersey
- Died: February 28, 1931 (aged 72); New York City, New York
- Relatives: Matthew C. Perry (great uncle); Oliver Hazard Perry (great uncle); Christopher Raymond Perry Rodgers (father); Raymond P. Rodgers (brother)
- Military career
- Allegiance: United States of America
- Branch: United States Navy
- Service years: 1878–1919
- Rank: Rear Admiral
- Commands: Battleship Division Six, Atlantic Fleet; Battleship Division Seven, Atlantic Fleet
- Conflicts: Spanish–American War; World War I
- Awards: Navy Distinguished Service Medal

Rear Admiral Thomas Slidell Rodgers (18 August 1858 – 28 February 1931) was an officer in the United States Navy who served during the Spanish–American War and World War I.

== Biography ==
Born at Morristown, New Jersey, Rodgers was a scion of one of the most famous naval families in American history. His great-uncle, Commodore John Rodgers, had commanded American forces during the First Barbary War and was the senior officer in the United States Navy at the outbreak of the War of 1812. His maternal great-grandfather was Captain Christopher Raymond Perry, who fought in the Quasi-War with France and was the father of naval heroes Oliver Hazard Perry and Matthew Calbraith Perry. Thomas Rodgers's father was Rear Admiral Christopher Raymond Perry Rodgers, and his older brother, Raymond Perry Rodgers, would also reach the rank of Rear Admiral. At one point or another during the first 25 years of the 20th century, five members of the Rodgers family were active flag officers in the U.S. Navy.

Following in the family footsteps, therefore, Rodgers attended the United States Naval Academy, from which he graduated in 1878. Details of his service during the first twenty years of his career are slim. It is known from sources, however, that he had achieved the rank of Lieutenant no later than 1894, when he served aboard Chicago. During and after the Spanish–American War, Rodgers served aboard Bennington. It is likely that this service included participation in the annexation of Wake Island on January 17, 1899. Promoted rapidly through the ranks following the end of the War, Rodgers served as executive officer of the battleship Maine, with the rank of Commander, from 1902 to 1905. Varied service ashore and afloat led to promotion to the rank of Captain, and in 1910, Rodgers was given command of the battleship New Hampshire, the last pre-dreadnought built for the U.S. Navy. In 1911, he was appointed to the post of Supervisor of New York Harbor, and in 1912, Rodgers succeeded Captain Templin M. Potts to become Director of Naval Intelligence, a position largely developed by his older brother Raymond Perry Rodgers, the second holder of that office.

In 1913, Rodgers was given command of the U.S. Navy's newest and most powerful dreadnought battleship, New York. Shortly after bringing her into commission on April 15, 1914, Rodgers took the New York south to the Gulf of Mexico, where she served as the flagship for Rear Admiral Frank Friday Fletcher's squadron blockading Veracruz, Mexico. In 1915, Rodgers served as flag captain of Battleship Division One of the Atlantic Fleet, commanded by Rear Admiral Henry T. Mayo. On June 13, 1916, Rodgers was promoted to the rank of Rear Admiral and served briefly with the Atlantic Fleet before going ashore to study at the Naval War College, where he would remain through 1917.

=== World War I ===
Utah, Admiral Rodgers's flagship during World War I, exercises with a kite balloon in Bantry Bay, Ireland.

On April 6, 1917, the United States declared war on Germany, entering World War I on the side of the Allies. As more and more American troops began to cross the Atlantic in 1918 for service on the Western Front, the Navy Department became increasingly worried about the threat posed by large German surface raiders breaking out into the Atlantic. Chief of Naval Operations Admiral William S. Benson, in particular, worried that if one or more of the German battlecruisers were to catch a weakly protected troop convoy, potentially thousands of American doughboys would be slaughtered.

In response to this threat, the Navy Department decided to send a division of battleships to Berehaven, Ireland, to act as a guard force against the possibility of a battlecruiser raid. Rear Admiral Rodgers, then in command of Battleship Division Six of the Atlantic Fleet, was selected for this assignment. The division departed for Ireland on August 12, 1918. On October 14, 1918, Rodgers received word that German cruisers might have escaped into the Atlantic. At the time, two troop convoys were approaching European waters. Battleship Division Six put to sea without delay and escorted both convoys out of the danger zone. Despite the prompt action of Admiral Rodgers and the ships under his command, no German warships had been in the Atlantic, and the convoys were never in any danger.

At the end of the war, Admiral Rodgers returned to service in the Atlantic Fleet, commanding Battleship Division Seven. For his service during World War I, he was decorated with the Navy Distinguished Service Medal. Rodgers retired from the Navy in July, 1919, after 41 years of service.

=== Death ===
Admiral Rodgers died on February 28, 1931, at the Polyclinic Hospital in New York City. According to The New York Times, Rodgers died suddenly, mere moments after being admitted. A lifelong bachelor, he was survived by his brother, Colonel Alexander Rodgers, and a sister, identified by The New York Times as "Mrs. Louis Nielsen." Admiral Rodgers was interred at Arlington National Cemetery.

Military offices
Preceded by Templin M. Potts	Head of the Office of Naval Intelligence (Director of Naval Intelligence); January 1912 – December 1913	Succeeded by Henry F. Bryan
