= HMS Jersey =

Eight ships of the Royal Navy have been named HMS Jersey after the island of Jersey, part of the Channel Islands; including

- English ship Jersey (1654), a frigate commissioned in 1654
- HMS Jersey (1694), a sixth-rate commissioned in 1694
- HMS Jersey (1698), a frigate commissioned in 1698
- HMS Jersey (1736), a frigate commissioned in 1736 and used as a prison ship in the American Revolutionary War
- HMS Jersey (1776), a sloop commissioned in 1776
- HMS Jersey (1860), a cutter commissioned in 1860
- HMS Jersey (F72), a J-class destroyer commissioned in 1939 and sunk in 1941.
- HMS Jersey (P295), an Island-class patrol ship commissioned in 1976 and sold to Bangladesh in 1994 as BNS Shaheed Ruhul Amin.
