= George Washington Rodgers =

US Navy officer (1822-1863)

George Washington Rodgers II
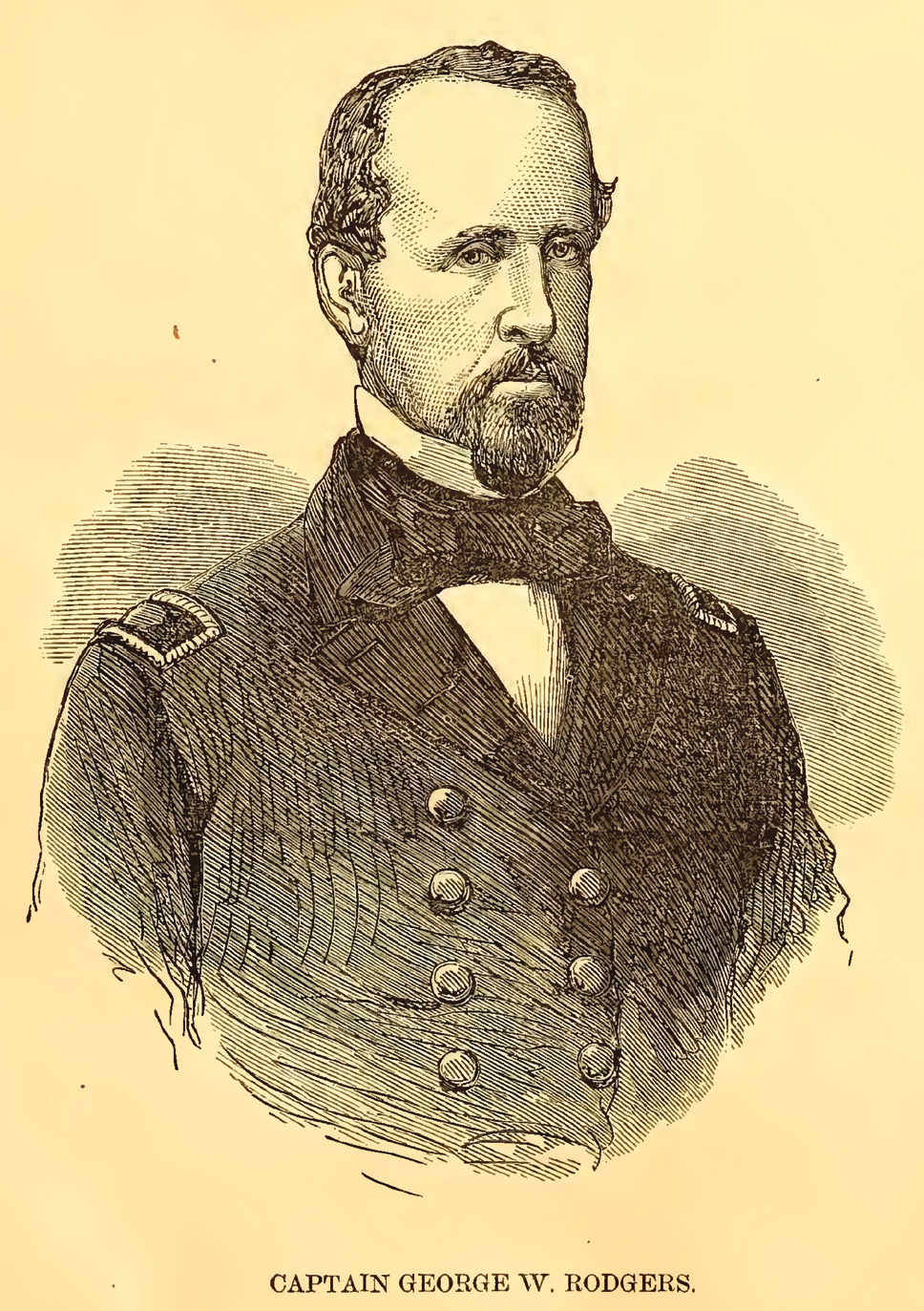
- Captain George W. Rodgers II
- Born: October 30, 1822; Brooklyn, New York City
- Died: August 17, 1863 (aged 40) off Charleston, South Carolina
- Relatives: Christopher Raymond Perry (grandfather); John Rodgers (grandfather); John Rodgers (uncle); Oliver Hazard Perry (uncle); Matthew C. Perry (uncle); Christopher Raymond Perry Rodgers (brother)
- Military career
- Allegiance: United States
- Branch: United States Navy
- Service years: 1836–1863
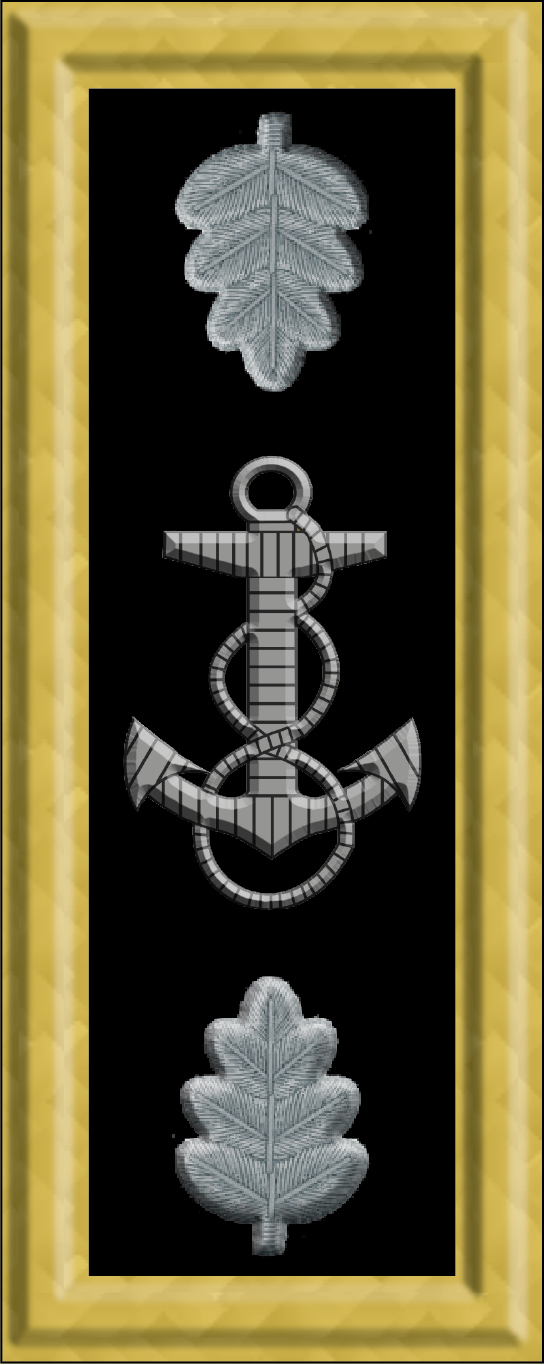
- Rank: Commander
- Commands: USS Tioga; USS Catskill
- Conflicts: Mexican–American War; American Civil War

Commander George Washington Rodgers II (October 30, 1822 – August 17, 1863) was an officer of the United States Navy.

== Biography ==
Rodgers was born in Brooklyn, the son of Captain George Washington Rodgers (1787–1832) and Anna Maria Perry. His maternal grandfather was Christopher Raymond Perry and he came from a family with an extensive history in the Navy.

Rodgers was warranted midshipman in the Navy on April 30, 1836, and was promoted to passed midshipman on July 1, 1842. He served in the West Indies, Africa, and Mediterranean. During the Mexican–American War (1846–1848), Rodgers served in the Gulf of Mexico as acting master on the steamer Colonel and frigate John Adams. Rodgers served with the United States Coast Survey from 1849 to 1850 and was promoted to lieutenant on June 4, 1850. Rodgers was assigned to duty on the sloop Germantown from 1851 to 1853.

In 1861 Rodgers became Commandant of Midshipmen at the United States Naval Academy, replacing his brother Christopher Raymond Perry Rodgers (1819–1892). In April 1861 he prevented capture of the Constitution by secessionists; he also transferred the Naval Academy to Newport, Rhode Island, where it would remain until returning to Annapolis in 1865, after the end of the American Civil War. Rodgers was promoted to commander on January 16, 1862. In 1863, seeking an active post in the Union Navy, he left his post and took command of a new ship, the Tioga, patrolling the James River.

Rodgers served in the West Indies enforcing the Union blockade against Confederate blockade runners. Rodgers commanded the ironclad monitor Catskill in two unsuccessful attacks on Charleston Harbor, in October 1862 and on April 7, 1863, at the First Battle of Charleston Harbor. Rodgers was appointed chief of staff to Rear Admiral John A. Dahlgren on July 4, 1863, and "was distinguished for his bravery in the silencing of Fort Sumter and the batteries on Morris Island."

Rodgers was killed aboard the Catskill on August 17, 1863, after a shot pierced the pilothouse while Rodgers commanded the attack on Fort Wagner in the Second Battle of Charleston Harbor.
