= Raymond P. Rodgers =

United States Navy admiral (1849–1925)

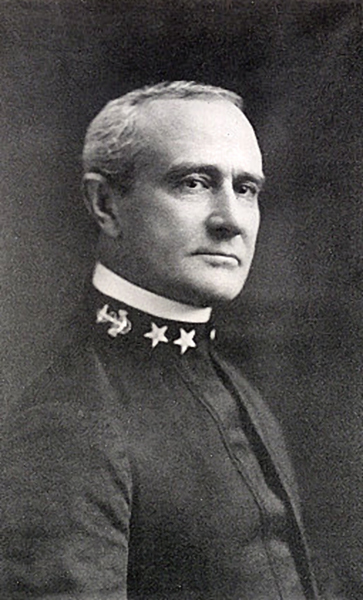
- Service photograph of Rear Admiral Raymond P. Rodgers
- Born: 20 December 1849; Washington, D.C., U.S.
- Died: 28 December 1925 (aged 76); Monte Carlo, Monaco
- Burial place: Arlington National Cemetery, Arlington, Virginia
- Relatives: Matthew C. Perry (great uncle); Oliver Hazard Perry (great uncle); Christopher Raymond Perry Rodgers (father); Thomas S. Rodgers (brother)
- Military career
- Allegiance: United States of America
- Branch: United States Navy
- Service years: 1868–1911
- Rank: Rear Admiral
- Commands: Office of Naval Intelligence; USS Nashville (PG-7); USS Kearsarge (BB-5); President of the Naval War College; Commandant, Naval Station Narragansett Bay
- Conflicts: Spanish–American War; Bombardment of San Juan; Battle of Santiago de Cuba; Philippine–American War; Boxer Rebellion

Rear Admiral Raymond Perry Rodgers (December 20, 1849 – December 28, 1925) was an officer in the United States Navy. He served as the second head of the Office of Naval Intelligence and as the 12th President of the Naval War College and fought in the Spanish–American War.

Rodgers' father was Rear Admiral Christopher Raymond Perry Rodgers (1819–1892), and he was the brother of Rear Admiral Thomas S. Rodgers (1858–1931). He was also the grandnephew to two renowned U.S. Navy commodores, Matthew C. Perry (1794–1858) and Oliver Hazard Perry (1785–1819).

== Naval career ==
Rodgers was born in Washington, D.C., on 20 December 1849, the son of Christopher Raymond Perry Rodgers and the former Julia Slidell. He entered the United States Naval Academy on 25 July 1864 and graduated in 1868. He served aboard the frigate USS Guerriere, flagship of the South Atlantic Squadron, from 1868 to 1869, was appointed as an ensign in 1869, and then served aboard the screw frigate USS Franklin, flagship of the European Station, from 1869 to 1871. He was promoted to master in 1870 while aboard Franklin. His next assignment was from 1871 to 1872 aboard the sloop-of-war USS Juniata, and he was promoted to lieutenant in 1872.

Rodgers returned to the U.S. Naval Academy as an instructor from 1873 to 1876. He then went back to sea, serving aboard the flagship of the Pacific Squadron, the screw steamship USS Pensacola, from 1876 to 1879. He performed another tour as a Naval Academy instructor from 1879 to 1882, teaching astronomy and navigation, then served in the North Atlantic Squadron aboard the screw frigate USS Tennessee from 1882 to 1884. He then began an assignment in the Bureau of Navigation.

Rodgers succeeded Lieutenant Theodorus B.M. Mason in April 1885 as the second Chief Intelligence Officer of the Office of Naval Intelligence (ONI), and while serving in that capacity he fostered closer ties between ONI and the United States Department of State, as they shared a mutual interest in Panama, Samoa, and the Kingdom of Hawaii. His tenure was also marked by ONI's first forays in cryptography, and he further encouraged research into new advances in naval technology through U.S. naval attachés, as well as keeping a close watch over European colonial interests in South America. In 1890, the year after his departure from ONI, the Navy transferred ONI from the Bureau of Navigation to the office of the United States Secretary of the Navy, which increased the demand on ONI for information, and despite Rodgers's efforts to make improvements during his tour, a weakness in its gathering of intelligence would be revealed in the Spanish–American War of 1898.

After leaving ONI in 1889, Rodgers served until 1892 aboard the protected cruiser USS Chicago, which at the time was the flagship of the Squadron of Evolution. From October 1892 until 1897, he served consecutively as U.S. naval attaché to France in Paris, to the Russian Empire in Saint Petersburg, and to Spain in Madrid, and was promoted to lieutenant commander in July 1894.

Rodgers reported aboard the battleship USS Iowa in June 1897 as her executive officer. Aboard Iowa, he saw action in the Spanish–American War of 1898, participating in the bombardment of San Juan, Puerto Rico, on 12 May 1898 and the blockade of the Cuban port of Santiago de Cuba. For his "imminent and conspicuous conduct" in the Battle of Santiago de Cuba, in which U.S. Navy forces destroyed the Spanish Navy squadron of Admiral Pascual Cervera y Topete on 3 July 1898, he advanced five numbers in grade.

Rodgers was promoted to commander on 3 March 1899. He commanded the gunboat USS Nashville from 1899 to 1900, operating in the West Indies and the Philippine Islands – where Nashville provided gunfire support to American troops fighting against Filipino insurgents during the Philippine–American War – and off China during the Boxer Rebellion. In 1901, he became aide to Admiral George Dewey, who was serving as President of the General Board of the United States Navy at the time. Late in 1901, Rodgers assumed duties at the New York Navy Yard in Brooklyn, New York.

Promoted to captain in 1903, Rodgers spent two years as commanding officer of the battleship USS Kearsarge in the North Atlantic Fleet.

Rodgers was reappointed Chief Intelligence Officer and returned to ONI in April 1906, succeeding Commander Seaton Schroeder, and was promoted to rear admiral on 4 July 1908. Rodgers in turn was succeeded at ONI by Captain Charles E. Vreeland in May 1909. He then spent the summer of 1909 in Europe, visiting the United Kingdom, the German Empire, France, and Italy to study their navies' organizational concepts and methods of operation and bring home information that could support anticipated United States Navy reforms in those areas.

On 6 October 1909, Rodgers became President of the Naval War College in Newport, Rhode Island; he also became Commandant of Naval Station Narragansett Bay, Rhode Island, that month. At the time, the college participated actively in U.S. Navy war planning. Acting on a suggestion by Captain William Ledyard Rodgers – who had learned it at the United States Army War College – Raymond P. Rodgers introduced the "applicability system" or "estimate of the situation" into Navy war planning, requiring that planning be developed through a four-step process involving "statement of mission, assessment of enemy forces and intentions, assessment of own forces, and evaluation of possible courses of action," which has remained fixed in Navy war planning ever since. Toward the end of Rodgers' tour, the United States Secretary of the Navy, George von Lengerke Meyer, removed war planning functions from the college, which favored more cautious approaches in plans for war with Japan, placing all planning responsibilities in the more aggressive General Board of the United States Navy.

Rodgers retired from the Navy upon the conclusion of his college presidency on 20 November 1911.

== Personal life and retirement ==
Rodgers was married to the former Gertrude Stuyvesant (d. 20 November 1933) and had one daughter, Julia S. Rodgers (d. 27 May 1950). He was a member of the University Club of New York and of the Metropolitan Club of Washington, D.C. In retirement, Rodgers lived abroad, and died in Monte Carlo, Monaco, where he made his home at the time, on 28 December 1925. He is buried in Arlington National Cemetery in Arlington, Virginia. His wife and daughter also are buried there.

== Gallery ==
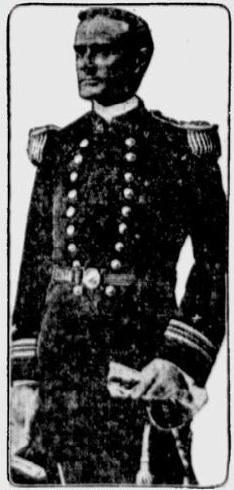
Newspaper photograph of Rodgers, 1909.

== Notes ==
Military offices
Preceded by Theodorus B.M. Mason	Head of the Office of Naval Intelligence (Chief Intelligence Officer); April 1885 – July 1889	Succeeded by Charles Henry Davis, Jr.
Preceded by Seaton Schroeder	Head of the Office of Naval Intelligence (Chief Intelligence Officer); April 1906 – May 1909	Succeeded by Charles E. Vreeland
Preceded by John Porter Merrell	President of the Naval War College; 6 October 1909 – 20 November 1911	Succeeded by William Ledyard Rodgers
