= Perryville =

Perryville may refer to a location in the United States:

== Communities ==
- Perryville, Alaska
- Perryville, Arkansas
- Perryville, Kentucky
  - Battle of Perryville, in the American Civil War
- Perryville, Maryland
- Perryville, Missouri
- Perryville, New Jersey
  - Perryville Tavern, listed on the NRHP in Hunterdon County, New Jersey
- Perryville, New York
- Perryville, Tennessee
- Perryville, Texas (disambiguation)

== Buildings ==
- Arizona State Prison Complex - Perryville, a prison in Goodyear, Maricopa County
- Perryville (McAlester, Oklahoma) on the list of NRHPs in Oklahoma

== See also ==
- Perrysville
