= Perry Township, Pennsylvania =

Perry Township is the name of several places in the U.S. state of Pennsylvania:

- Perry Township, Armstrong County, Pennsylvania
- Perry Township, Berks County, Pennsylvania
- Perry Township, Clarion County, Pennsylvania
- Perry Township, Fayette County, Pennsylvania
- Perry Township, Greene County, Pennsylvania
- Perry Township, Jefferson County, Pennsylvania
- Perry Township, Lawrence County, Pennsylvania
- Perry Township, Mercer County, Pennsylvania
- Perry Township, Snyder County, Pennsylvania
