= Perrysville =

Perrysville may refer to:

- Perrysville, Indiana
- Perrysville, Ohio
- Perrysville, Pennsylvania

== See also ==
- Perryville
