= Commodore Oliver Perry Farm =

- U.S. National Register of Historic Places
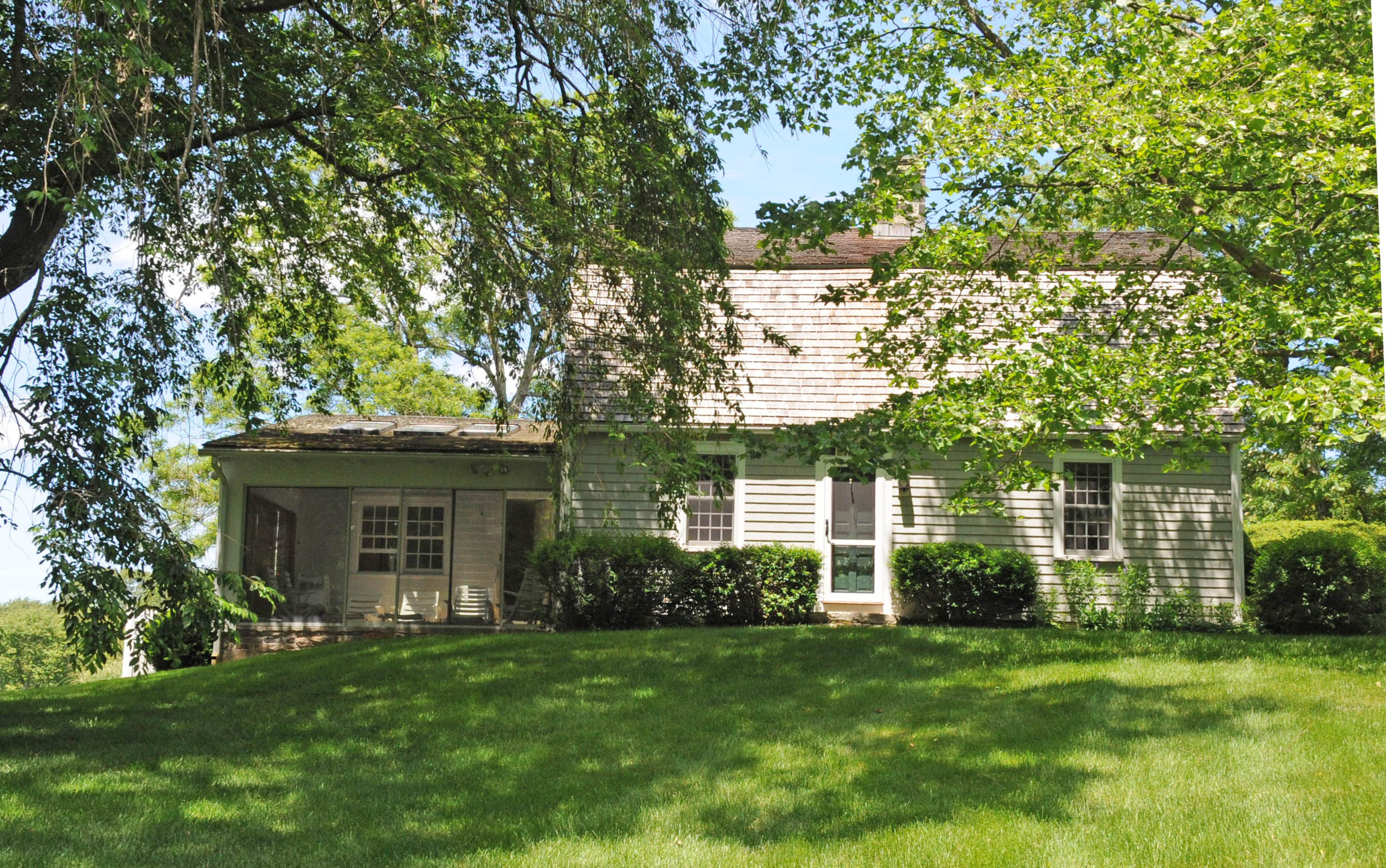

- Location within Rhode Island Location within the United States
- Location: South Kingstown, Rhode Island
- Coordinates: 41°25′8″N 71°31′50″W
- Area: 21 acres (8.5 ha)
- Architectural style: Colonial
- NRHP reference No.: 82000020
- Added to NRHP: August 26, 1982

The Commodore Oliver Perry Farm is an historic farm on United States Route 1 in South Kingstown, Rhode Island. The farm consists of 250 acres (100 ha) of rolling fields and woodlands on the west side of the road. The main farm complex includes a wood-frame house, barn (since adapted for residential use), a caretaker's residence, and a number of other outbuildings, accessed via a winding private lane. The main house, a two-story gambrel-roofed structure, is of uncertain construction date, and is generally dated to either 1785 or 1815. It has been extensively altered, and been the subject of well-meaning but historically problematic restorations in the first half of the 20th century.

The property's significance lies in its association with members of the Perry family, specifically Oliver Hazard Perry, the United States Navy commodore responsible for the American victory in the 1813 Battle of Lake Erie, and Admiral Matthew C. Perry, who was responsible for the Opening of Japan in 1854. It is plausible that Oliver Hazard Perry was born on this property, which belonged to his grandfather, and that he built the now-standing house on the site of his grandfather's mansion after acquiring the property at auction in 1814. The property was acquired in 1865 by George Tiffany, the son-in-law of Matthew Perry, and was used as a rental property until the 1920s. In the late 1920s it underwent a "restoration" guided by Tiffany's widow, which brought the house interior into a romanticized Colonial Revival state, and was open for a time as a museum to the two leading figures of the Perry family. After again falling into decline, it underwent a second rehabilitation in 1944-45 by private owners.

A 21-acre (8.5 ha) area of the farm was listed on the National Register of Historic Places in 1982.

== See also ==
- National Register of Historic Places listings in Washington County, Rhode Island
