= Perryville Tavern =

- U.S. National Register of Historic Places
- New Jersey Register of Historic Places
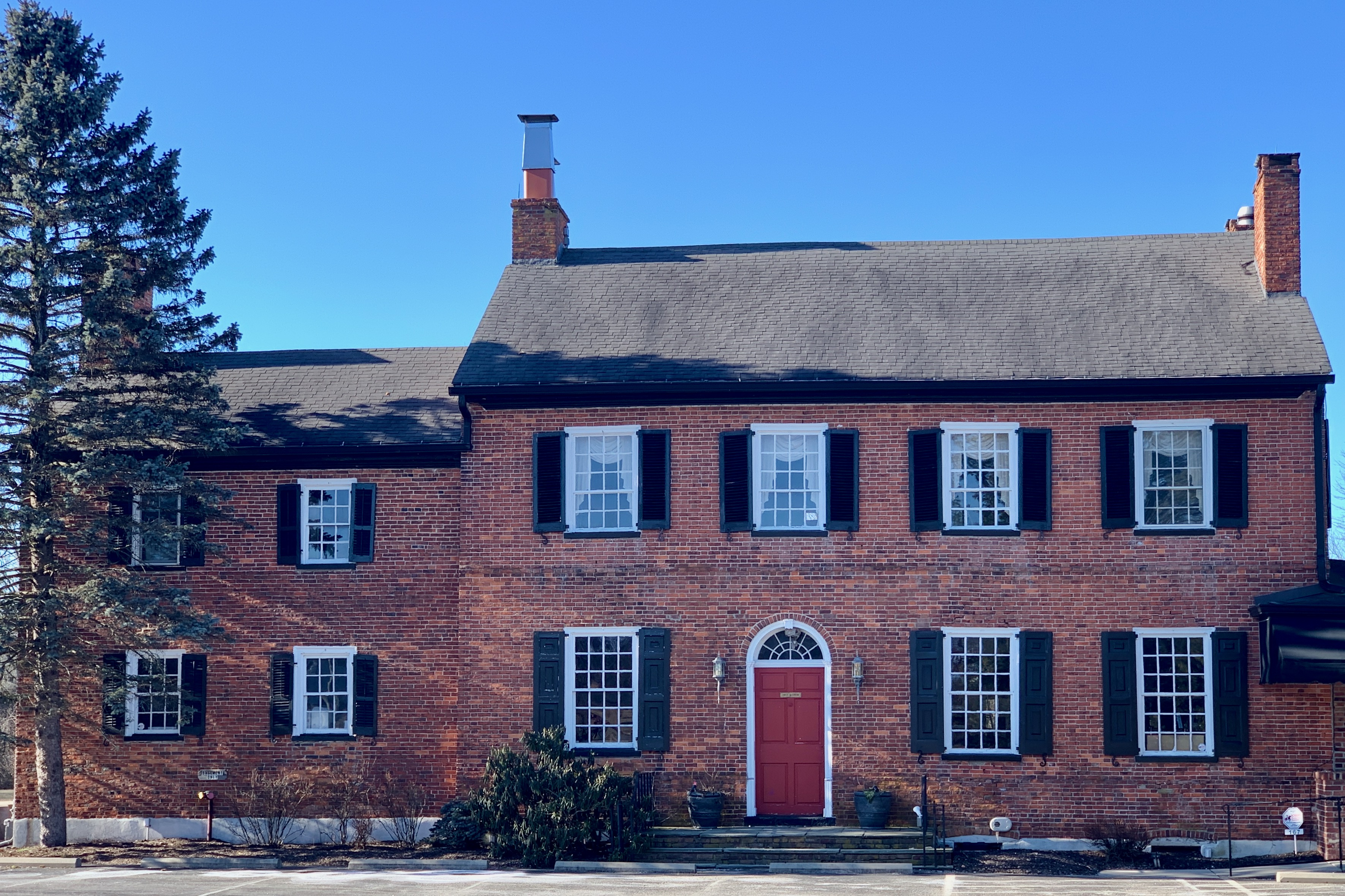
- Perryville Tavern in 2021

- Location within Hunterdon County, New Jersey Location within New Jersey Location within the United States
- Location: 167 Perryville Road, Perryville, New Jersey
- Nearest city: Clinton, New Jersey
- Coordinates: 40°37′59″N 74°58′12″W
- Area: 5 acres (2.0 ha)
- Built: 1813
- Built by: Cornelius Carhart
- Architectural style: Federal
- NRHP reference No.: 77000874
- NJRHP No.: 1636

Significant dates
- Added to NRHP: July 15, 1977
- Designated NJRHP: October 19, 1976

The Perryville Tavern, also known as the Perryville Inn, is a historic building at 167 Perryville Road in Perryville, Union Township, Hunterdon County, New Jersey. It was added to the National Register of Historic Places on July 15, 1977 for its significance in architecture and commerce. The tavern is located west of Clinton, south of the intersection of Interstate 78 and Perryville Road.

== History ==
The Perryville Tavern was built in 1813 by Cornelius Carhart on the stage coach route, built in 1806 as the New Jersey Turnpike, between Easton, Pennsylvania and New Brunswick, New Jersey. It was named after Commodore Oliver Hazard Perry for his naval victory at the Battle of Lake Erie on September 10, 1813.

In 1900, it stopped being a public tavern, and became a private residence. In 1957, planning for the construction of Interstate 78 placed the building in the new right of way. It was then purchased by the state and subsequently moved 1000 feet south in January 1960 to its current location and operated as a restaurant.

== Description ==
The tavern is a two and one-half story brick building with Federal architecture style. It has been noted as a relatively rare example of this style in the county. Local artist, William Bonnell, may have painted a tavern sign, with a portrait of Andrew Jackson on one side and an American flag on the other for the inn.
