= William Bonnell =

American painter (1804–1865)

- Born: February 1, 1804; Clinton, New Jersey, U.S.
- Died: October 12, 1865 (aged 61)
- Occupation: Portrait painter

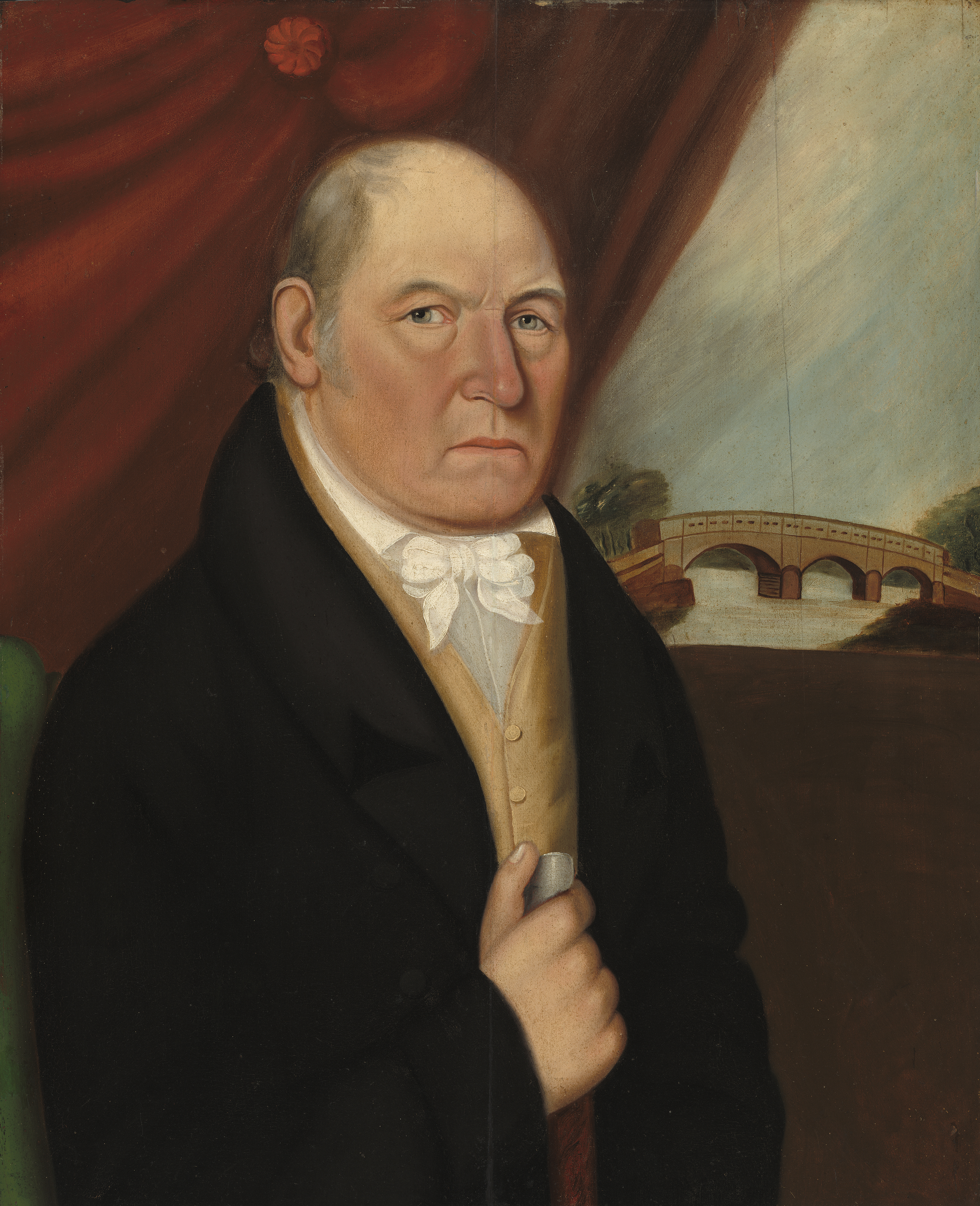
Portrait of Clement Bonnell, the artist's father (c. 1825)

William Bonnell (February 1, 1804 – October 12, 1865) was an American portrait painter. His works are generally placed in the folk art category, due to his lack of formal training.

== Biography ==
Born in Clinton, New Jersey, Bonnell was the second son of Colonel Clement Bonnell (1766-1836) and Rachel Wolverton. His grandfather was the Revolutionary War Colonel Abraham Bonnell (1732-1797), the proprietor of a tavern that was one of the first recruiting places for minutemen in that area. He married Margaret Hinchman (1813-1901) in 1836.

As of now, only twenty paintings of his are known to exist, most inscribed with his name and a date on the reverse. An unsigned painting of a hunting dog with the unlikely name of "Chustetunk's Frosty Ferris" may be his first canvas. His first signed and dated works are from 1823. Traditionally, a sign that was originally in Hampton at the Perryville Inn, with Andrew Jackson and an American flag, is credited to him, but he was not known as a sign painter. Most of his works date from c.1825, when he painted the likenesses of several Hunterdon County residents.

Only one painting from outside New Jersey is attested to; showing Andrew and Eliza Everhart Yerkes; farmers in Warminster, Pennsylvania. No works after c.1835 have been discovered. His proficiency shows a distinct improvement over the course of his career; including the addition of background landscapes.

Some of his works may be seen at the Art Institute of Chicago. The sign is at the Hunterdon County Historical Association in Flemington.
