= Perryville, New Jersey =

Populated place in Hunterdon County, New Jersey, US

- Unincorporated community
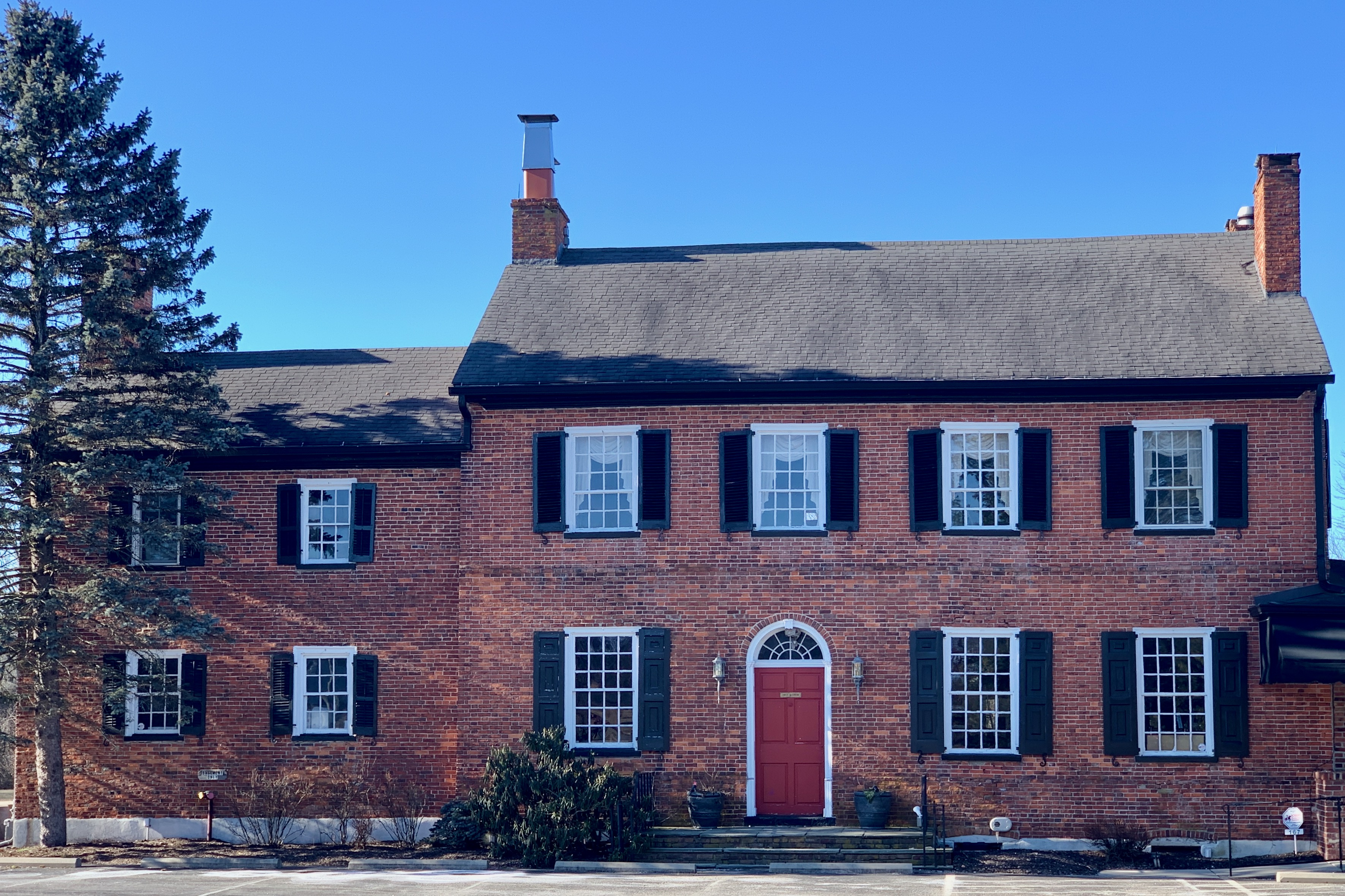
- Perryville Tavern, listed on the NRHP

- Location within Hunterdon County, New Jersey Location within New Jersey Location within the United States
- Coordinates: 40°38′09″N 74°58′10″W
- Country: United States
- State: New Jersey
- County: Hunterdon
- Township: Union
- Named for: Oliver Hazard Perry
- Elevation: 364 ft (111 m)
- GNIS feature ID: 879242

Perryville is an unincorporated community located at the intersection of Interstate 78 and Perryville Road within Union Township in Hunterdon County, New Jersey.

The Perryville Station, one of the New Jersey State Police Troop B road stations, is located here.

== History ==
In 1806, the stage coach route, known as the New Jersey Turnpike, running between Easton, Pennsylvania and New Brunswick, New Jersey, was built through here. The village formed around the Perryville Tavern built in 1813 and named after Commodore Oliver Hazard Perry for his naval victory at the Battle of Lake Erie that year.
