= USS Nonsuch =

History

United States
- Name: Nonsuch
- Owner: George Stiles
- Launched: 1812
- Fate: Sold 23 December 1812, at Charleston

United States
- Name: USS Nonsuch
- Acquired: by purchase, 23 December 1812, at Charleston
- Decommissioned: December 1825
- Fate: Sold, 1826

General characteristics
- Type: Schooner
- Tons burthen: 148, or 154 (bm)
- Length: 86 ft (26 m)
- Beam: 21 ft (6.4 m)
- Draft: 9 ft (2.7 m)
- Propulsion: Sail
- Complement: Privateer:100-110; US Navy:61 officers and enlisted
- Armament: Privateer:12 × 12-pounder carronades; US Navy:14 guns; Post-war:5 × 12-pounder carronades + 1 × 12-pounder gun

USS Nonsuch was a moderately successful privateer built in 1812 and then an armed schooner in the United States Navy during the War of 1812. She was sold for breaking up in 1826.

== Privateer ==
Nonsuch was built in 1812 in Baltimore, Maryland. Her owner, George Stiles and Company, received a commission for Nonsuch as a letter of marque on 7 October 1812. Under Captain Henry Levely, the schooner soon commenced privateering along the East Coast of the United States and in the West Indies seeking British shipping.

By mistake she attacked and captured the American privateer Joseph and Mary, killing and wounding several of the crew. (Note: Joseph and Mary, of Baltimore, had a crew of 73 men under the command of Captain N. Wescott, and was armed with four guns.)

Nonsuch attacked two British armed vessels, a ship and a schooner, off Martinique on 28 September. Nonsuch fought these two ships for three hours in an extremely furious battle, causing great confusion and killing or wounding a considerable number of the enemy. Unfortunately damage to her own rigging prevented Nonsuch from pursuing the British ships as they fled to Martinique. Nonsuch suffered three men killed and eight wounded; the British suffered seven killed and 16 wounded.

During her time as a privateer, Nonsuch captured nine vessels, two of which were American vessels with a British license (Lic).

Name	Type	Disposition
Ann Maria	Schooner	Lost
Mary (Lic)	Schooner	Sent in
Eleanore Ann (Lic)		Retaken
Perseverance	Schooner	Charleston
Fame	Schooner	Baltimore; restored
Fame	Schooner	Savannah
Francis	Brig	Charleston
	Ship	Set in
	Sloop	Sent in

== US Navy service ==
The U.S. Navy purchased Nonsuch at Charleston, South Carolina, on 23 December 1812. Lieutenant James Mork sailed her in January 1813 to carry supplies to the United States Army at Fort Johnson. She then resumed cruising in search of English merchantmen.

Nonsuch captured British schooner Sancho Panza in early April 1813 and took the cutter Caledonia (8 guns and 40 men), of Nassau, Hinson, master, following a bloody seven-minute fight on the 9th. Caledonia had an additional 11 guns, of various sizes, in her hold. She had three men killed, seven wounded (two dangerously), and three men missing; Nonsuch had one man dangerously wounded and two slightly wounded. A report stated that Caledonia's crew consisted primarily of blacks.

Nonsuch continued her patrols out of Charleston into 1814. In June, off Charleston Bar, an enemy ship of superior force and speed chased Nonsuch, forcing Nonsuch to throw 11 of her guns overboard in order to escape.

Following the war, Nonsuch cruised in the West Indies. In 1819, she, with frigates John Adams and Constellation, sailed in a squadron under Captain Oliver Hazard Perry, for the Orinoco River, Venezuela, arriving 15 July. their mission was to discourage piracy while still maintaining friendly relations with Venezuela and the Republic of Buenos Aires. Shifting his flag to Nonsuch, Commodore Perry sailed upriver to negotiate an anti-piracy agreement with President Simón Bolívar. A favorable treaty was signed on 11 August, but by the time Nonsuch started downriver, Perry and many of her crew had been stricken with yellow fever. Commodore Perry died on board the USS John Adams shortly its arrival at Trinidad on 23 August. He was buried at Trinidad with great honors while Nonsuch's crew acted as honor guard.

Returning to the United States, Nonsuch operated off the East Coast and in the Caribbean against piracy and made a short deployment to the Mediterranean.

The U.S. schooner Nonsuch, which sailed from this port about three weeks since for the Mediterranean, has put into Newport in distress, having encountered a severe gale in the Gulf stream on the 18th ult and lost one of her masts, her rudder, and several spars.

Lawrence Kearny who later achieved the rank of Commodore (United States) served aboard the USS Nonsuch as an officer.

== Fate ==
Nonsuch was placed in ordinary at Boston, Massachusetts, in December 1825. She was sold in 1826, and broken up the same year.
