= USS Revenge (1806) =

History

United States
- Acquired: by purchase, 1806
- Fate: Run aground, 9 January 1811

General characteristics
- Type: Schooner
- Length: 70 ft (21 m)
- Armament: 12 × 6 pdr (2.7 kg) guns

The third Revenge was a schooner in the United States Navy during the years preceding the War of 1812.

== Early service ==
The Navy purchased the Baltimore-built schooner Ranger at New Orleans in December 1806. She was renamed and commissioned as Revenge. In 1807 she was ordered to the Atlantic coast under the command of Lt. Jacob Jones, joining Commodore John Rodgers' New York Flotilla, which assembled shortly after the Chesapeake-Leopard Affair to protect shipping in the vicinity of the Hampton Roads. With the passage of Thomas Jefferson's Embargo Act on 22 December 1807, the flotilla established a blockade of the US coast to prevent foreign commerce.

== Later service ==
In 1809, Lt. Oliver Hazard Perry relieved Jones in command of Revenge. The passage of the Non-Intercourse Act on 1 March 1809 had removed most restrictions on foreign commerce (excepting France and Britain, which were at war with each other), and the ship widened her area of operation, cruising south to the tip of Florida and north to the coast of New England.

In April 1810, the schooner entered the Washington Navy Yard for repairs. The following July, while cruising off Charleston, South Carolina, Revenge was ordered to Amelia Island, Florida, then Spanish territory, to free an American ship, Diana, which had been seized in Spanish waters and placed under British colors. Undaunted by the presence of two British warships, Perry boarded the ship, manned her with a prize crew, and sailed away.

== Wreck ==
That winter, Revenge was charting coastal waters and harbours near Newport, Rhode Island, New London, Connecticut, and Gardiners Bay, Long Island, New York. On 9 January 1811, she ran aground on a reef off of Watch Hill, Rhode Island, while attempting to navigate a hazardous stretch of water known as 'The Race' in heavy fog. Cargo was unloaded onto other ships, and Revenge was pulled off the rocks. However, the tow rope parted and she began to drift, foundering, and eventually sank. The records maintained by the Department of the Navy consider her to have been abandoned.

Perry was cleared of responsibility for loss of the ship during the consequent court-martial proceedings. The court held the ship's pilot responsible for the wreck, as he had assured Perry of his ability to navigate Block Island Sound.

== Possible discovery ==
On 7 January 2011, local divers Charles Buffum and Craig Harger announced the discovery of a shipwreck that matched the location and size of the sunken Revenge, including the sighting of cannons and an anchor. They had not, as of that date, been able to recover any artifact establishing the identity of the discovered vessel.

In February 2012, the US Navy sent researchers to map the wreck, along with experts from the Woods Hole Oceanographic Institution. The Navy declined to speculate on whether the ship really was Revenge, but a representative said that if it were, the ship would be "an incredibly important part of American history."
