= Perryville, Texas =

Perryville, Texas is the name of two small communities in Texas:

- Perryville, Bastrop County, Texas, is a small community formerly located 2 1/2 miles south of the site of present-day Elgin in Bastrop County.
- Perryville, Wood County, Texas, at the intersection of Farm to Market Roads 2088 and 852, is 8 miles southeast of Winnsboro in northeastern Wood County.
