= Oliver Hazard Perry =

United States Navy officer (1785–1819)

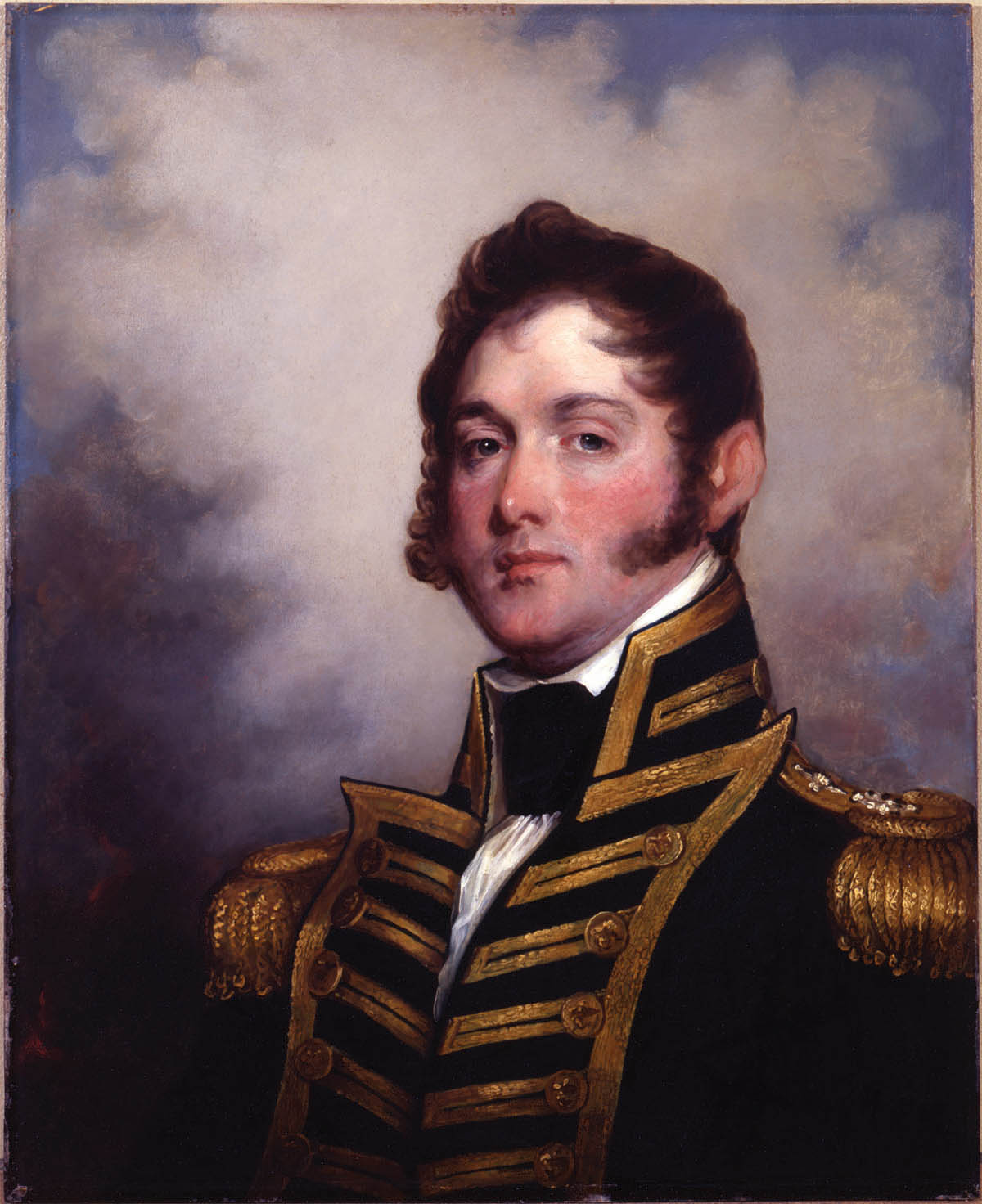
- 1818 portrait
- Born: August 23, 1785; South Kingstown, Rhode Island, U.S.
- Died: August 23, 1819 (aged 34); Trinidad
- Burial place: Island Cemetery, Newport, Rhode Island
- Relatives: Christopher Perry (father); Matthew Calbraith Perry (brother)
- Military career
- Allegiance: United States
- Branch: United States Navy
- Service years: 1799–1819
- Rank: Commodore
- Commands: USS Nautilus; USS Revenge; US Naval Forces, Lake Erie; USS Lawrence; USS Niagara; USS Nonsuch; USS Java
- Conflicts: Quasi-War; Haitian Revolution; First Barbary War; Battle of Derna; War of 1812; Battle of Lake Erie; Battle of the Thames
- Awards: Congressional Gold Medal

Oliver Hazard Perry (August 23, 1785 – August 23, 1819) was a United States Navy officer from South Kingstown, Rhode Island. A prominent member of the Perry family naval dynasty, he was the son of Sarah Wallace Alexander and Captain Christopher Raymond Perry, and older brother of Commodore Matthew C. Perry.

Perry served in the West Indies during the Quasi War of 1798–1800 against France, in the Mediterranean during the Barbary Wars of 1801–1815, and in the Caribbean fighting piracy and the slave trade, but is most noted for his role in the War of 1812 during the 1813 Battle of Lake Erie. During the war against Britain, Perry supervised the building of a fleet at Erie, Pennsylvania. He earned the title "Hero of Lake Erie" for leading American forces in a decisive naval victory at the Battle of Lake Erie, receiving a Congressional Gold Medal and the Thanks of Congress.

His leadership materially aided the successful outcomes of all nine Lake Erie military campaign victories, and the victory was a turning point in the battle for the west in the war. He is remembered for the words on his battle flag, "DONT [sic] GIVE UP THE SHIP", which was a tribute to the dying command of his colleague Captain James Lawrence of USS Chesapeake. He is also known for his message to General William Henry Harrison, which reads in part, "We have met the enemy and they are ours."

Perry became embroiled in a long-standing and bitter controversy with the commander of USS Niagara, Captain Jesse Elliott, over their conduct in the Battle of Lake Erie, and both were the subject of official charges. In 1815, he successfully commanded Java in the Mediterranean during the Second Barbary War. So seminal was his career that he was lionized in the press (being the subject of scores of books and articles). He has been frequently memorialized, and many places, ships and persons have been named in his honor.

== Childhood and early life ==
Perry was the oldest of five boys born to Christopher and Sarah Wallace Perry (née Alexander). As a boy, Perry lived in Tower Hill, Rhode Island, sailing ships in anticipation of his future career as an officer in the United States Navy. Perry came from a long line of naval men from both sides of his family. His mother taught Perry and his younger brothers to read and write and had them attend Trinity Episcopal Church regularly, where he was baptized by Reverend William Smith on April 1, 1794, at the age of nine. Reverend Theodore Dehon, rector of the church from 1797 to 1810, had a significant influence on the young Perry. He was educated in Newport, Rhode Island. His earliest ancestor to the Americas was Edward Perry, who came from Devon, England, and settled in Sandwich, Massachusetts, around 1650 with his wife, Mary Freeman.

== Early naval career ==
Through his father's influence, Perry was appointed a midshipman in the United States Navy, at the age of thirteen, on April 7, 1799. Perry sailed aboard USS General Greene, of which his father was commanding officer, on her maiden voyage in June 1799. The ship made its first stop in Cuba, charged with receiving American merchant ships and providing escort from Havana to the United States. Perry's service aboard General Greene continued during the Quasi-War with France. He first experienced combat on February 9, 1800, off the coast of the French colony of Haiti, which was in a state of rebellion.

During the First Barbary War, he served aboard USS Adams and later was first lieutenant (second in command) of USS Nautilus. He then served under Captain John Rodgers on USS Constitution and USS Essex. He was placed in charge of the construction of gunboats in Newport and Westerly, Rhode Island.

Beginning in April 1809, he commanded the sloop USS Revenge, engaging in patrol duties to enforce the Embargo Act, as well as a successful raid to regain an American ship held in Spanish territory in Florida. On January 9, 1811, Revenge ran aground off Rhode Island and was lost. "Seeing fairly quickly that he could not save the vessel, [Perry] turned his attention to saving the crew, and after helping them down the ropes over the vessel's stern, he was the last to leave the vessel." The subsequent court-martial exonerated Perry, placing blame on the ship's pilot. (Note: His progression from being the subject of a court-martial for running aground to being a formidable commander who made a real difference has a striking parallel to the career of Admiral Chester W. Nimitz.) In January 2011, a team of divers claimed to have discovered the remains of Revenge, nearly 200 years to the day after it sank. Cannons from Revenge were salvaged by the U.S. Navy in 2017.

Following the court-martial, Perry was given a leave of absence from the Navy. On May 5, 1811, he married Elizabeth Champlin Mason of Newport, Rhode Island, whom he had met at a dance in 1807. They enjoyed an extended honeymoon touring New England. The couple would eventually have five children, with one dying in infancy.

== War of 1812 ==
At the beginning of the War of 1812, the British Royal Navy controlled the Great Lakes, except for Lake Huron. The United States Navy controlled Lake Champlain. The American naval forces were very small, allowing the British to make many advances in the Great Lakes and northern New York waterways. The roles played by commanders like Perry, at Lake Erie and Isaac Chauncey at Lake Ontario and Thomas Macdonough at Lake Champlain all proved vital to the naval effort.

Naval historian E. B. Potter noted that "all naval officers of the day made a special study of Nelson's battles." Oliver Perry was no exception. At his request, he was given command of the American naval forces on Lake Erie during the war. Secretary of the Navy Paul Hamilton had charged prominent merchant seaman Daniel Dobbins with building the American fleet on Presque Isle Bay at Erie, Pennsylvania, and Perry was named chief naval officer.

Perry knew battle was coming, and he "consciously followed Nelson's example in describing his battle plans to his captains." Perry's instructions were:

Commanding officers are particularly enjoined to pay attention in preserving their stations in the Line, and in all cases to keep as near the Lawrence as possible. ... Engage your designated adversary, in close action, at half cable's length. (Note: A "cable" is 720 feet in the Royal Navy, 600 feet (183 m) in the U.S. Navy. "Half cable's length" would be less than 330 feet (100 m).)

— Oliver H. Perry, General Order, USS Lawrence

=== Hero of Lake Erie ===
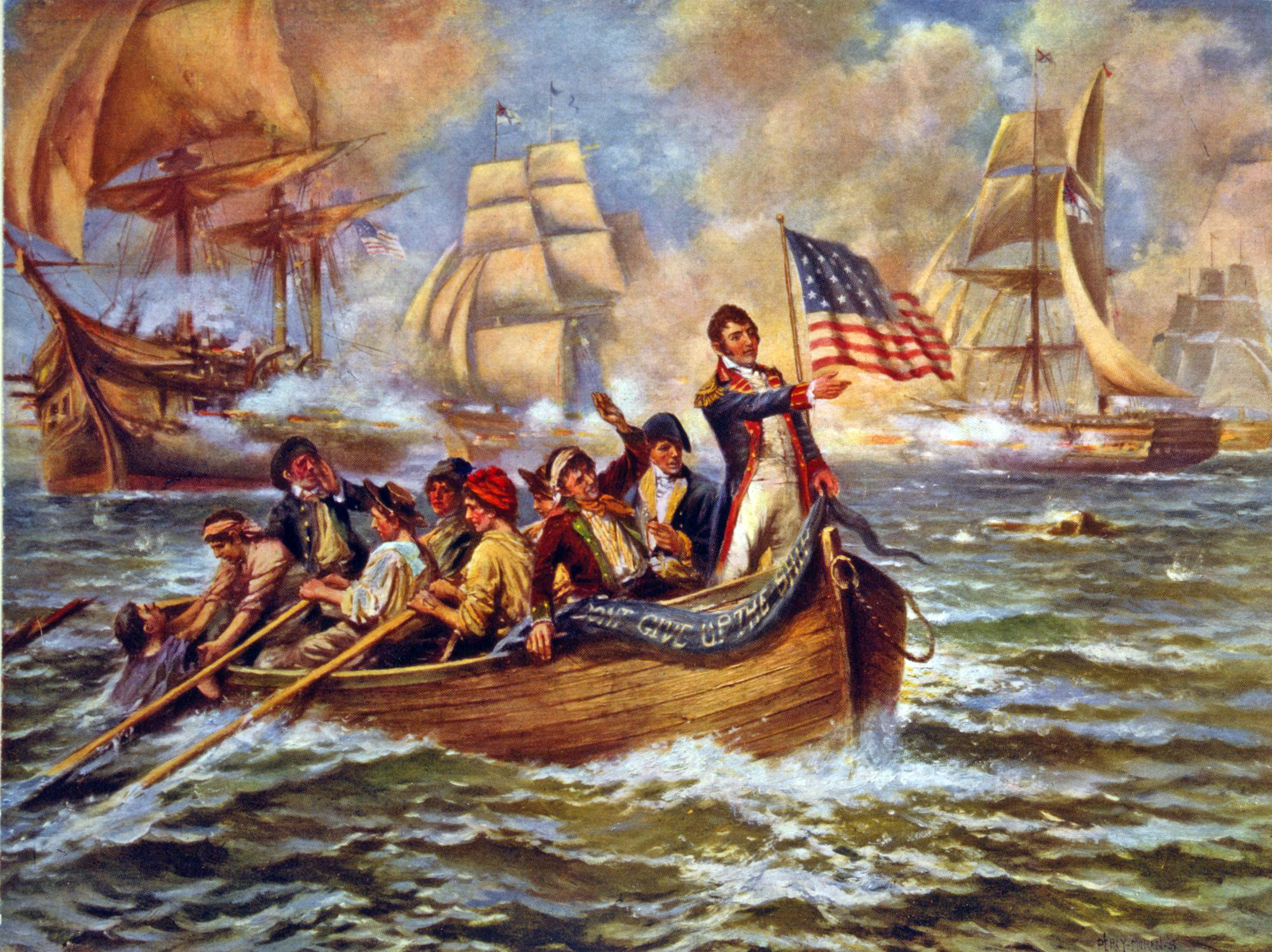
Perry (standing) after abandoning Lawrence, in a 1911 painting by Edward Percy Moran

On September 10, 1813, Perry's squadron fought the Battle of Lake Erie against a smaller Royal Navy squadron. It was at the outset of this battle that Perry famously said, "If a victory is to be gained, I will gain it." Initially, the exchange of gunfire favored the British. Perry's flagship, USS Lawrence, was so severely disabled in the encounter that the British commander, Robert Heriot Barclay, thought that Perry would surrender it, and sent a small boat to request that the American vessel pull down its flag.

Faithful to the words of his battle flag, "DONT [sic] GIVE UP THE SHIP", a paraphrase of the dying words of Captain James Lawrence, the ship's namesake and Perry's friend, Perry, with Lawrence's chaplain and purser as the remaining able crew, personally fired the final salvo. He then had his men row him a half-mile (0.8 km) through heavy gunfire to transfer his command to USS Niagara. Once aboard, Perry dispatched Niagara's commander, Captain Jesse Elliott, to bring the other schooners into closer action while he steered Niagara toward the damaged British ships. Like Nelson's Victory at Trafalgar, Niagara broke the opposing line.

Perry's force pounded Barclay's ships until they could offer no effective resistance and surrendered. Although he had won the battle aboard Niagara, he received Barclay's surrender on the deck of the recaptured Lawrence to allow him to see the terrible price Perry's men had paid. Perry's battle report to General William Henry Harrison was famously brief: "We have met the enemy and they are ours; two ships, two brigs, one schooner and one sloop." (Note: The British order of battle was actually two ships, one brig, two schooners and one sloop. "Perry's message was inaccurate.") The six captured ships were successfully returned to Presque Isle.

Perry's battle flag; note the missing apostrophe in "DONT"

Although the engagement was small compared to Napoleonic naval battles such as the Battle of Trafalgar, the victory had disproportionate strategic importance, opening Canada up to further American invasions, while simultaneously protecting the entire Ohio Valley. The loss of Barclay's squadron directly led to the critical Battle of the Thames, a victory over British and Indian forces by Harrison's army, the deaths of Tecumseh and Roundhead, and the breakup of his confederacy. Along with the Battle of Plattsburgh, it was one of only two battle of the war in which an entire squadron was defeated.

Perry was involved in nine battles that led to and followed the Battle of Lake Erie, and they all had a seminal impact. "What is often overlooked when studying Perry is how his physical participation and brilliant strategic leadership influenced the outcomes of all nine Lake Erie military campaign victories:

Capturing Fort George, Ontario in the Battle of Fort George; Destroying the British munitions at Olde Fort Erie (see Capture of Fort Erie); Rescuing five vessels from Black Rock; Building the Erie fleet; Getting the ships over the sandbar; Blocking British supplies for a month prior to battle; Planning the Thames invasion with General Harrison; Winning the Battle of Lake Erie; and Winning the Battle of Thames.

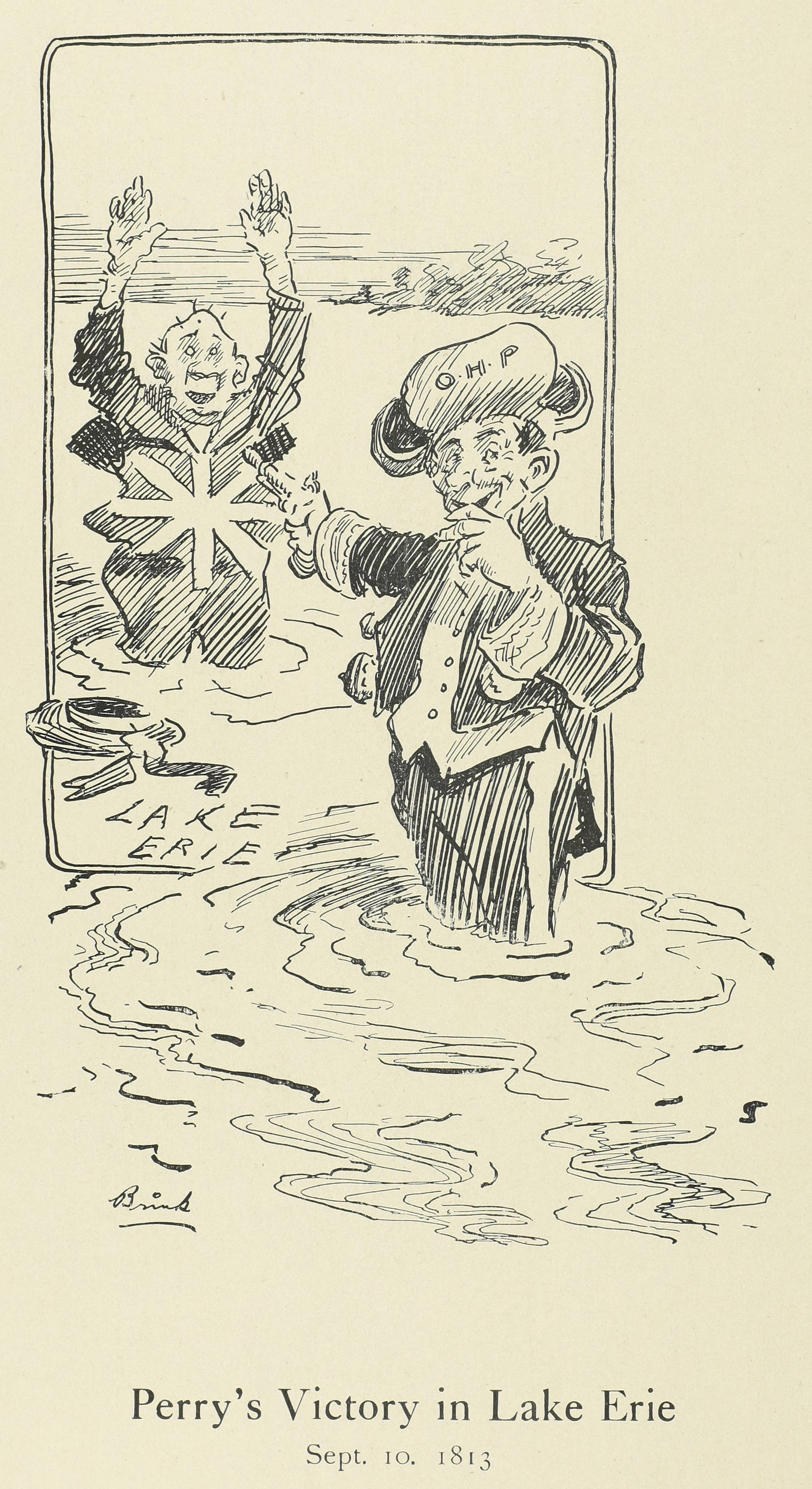
A caricature of Perry's victory on Lake Erie from the 1906 book "Men of Toledo (and Their Neighbors)"

=== Battle flag ===
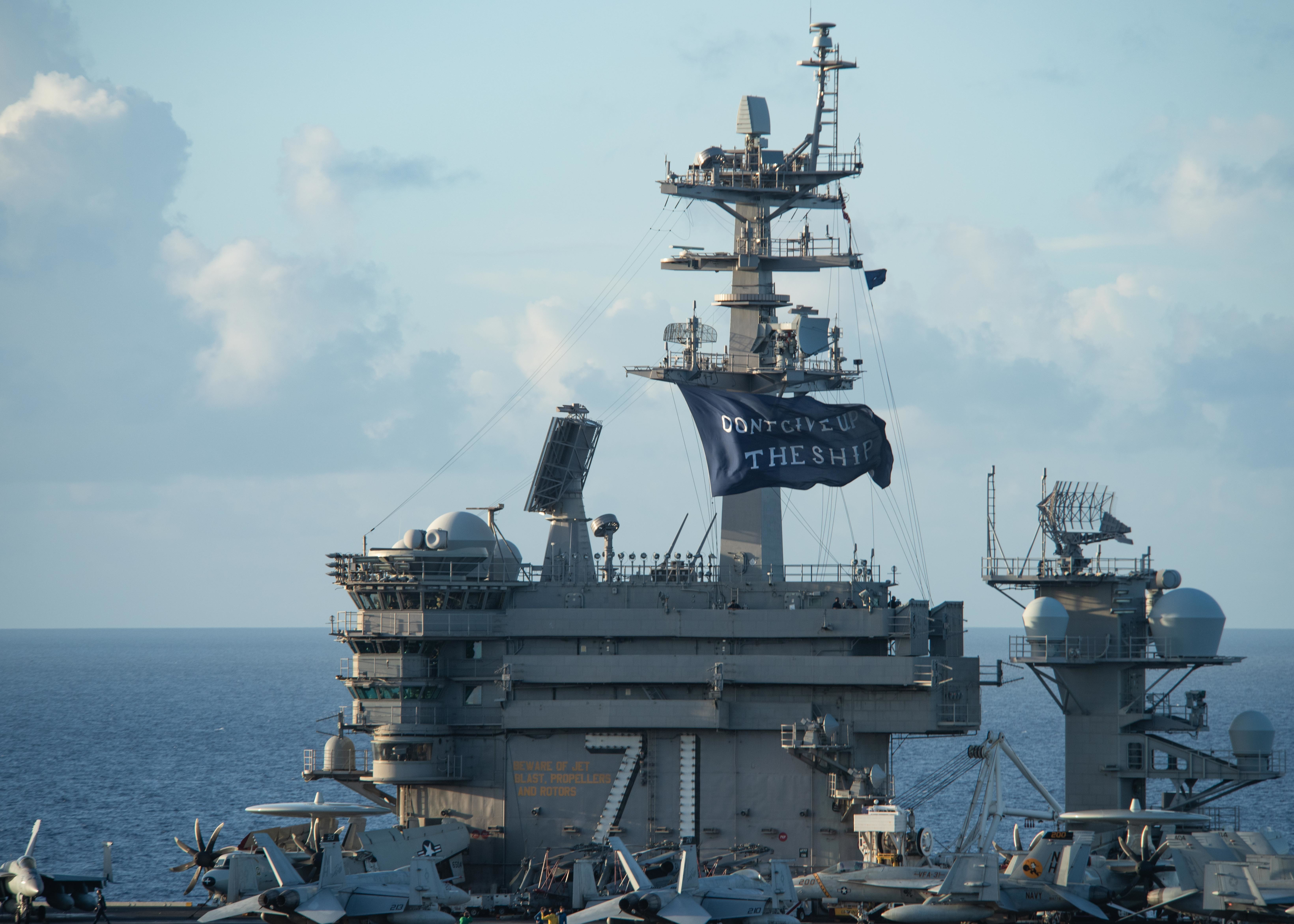
USS Theodore Roosevelt (CVN-71) flies a replica "DONT [sic] GIVE UP THE SHIP" flag in 2020.

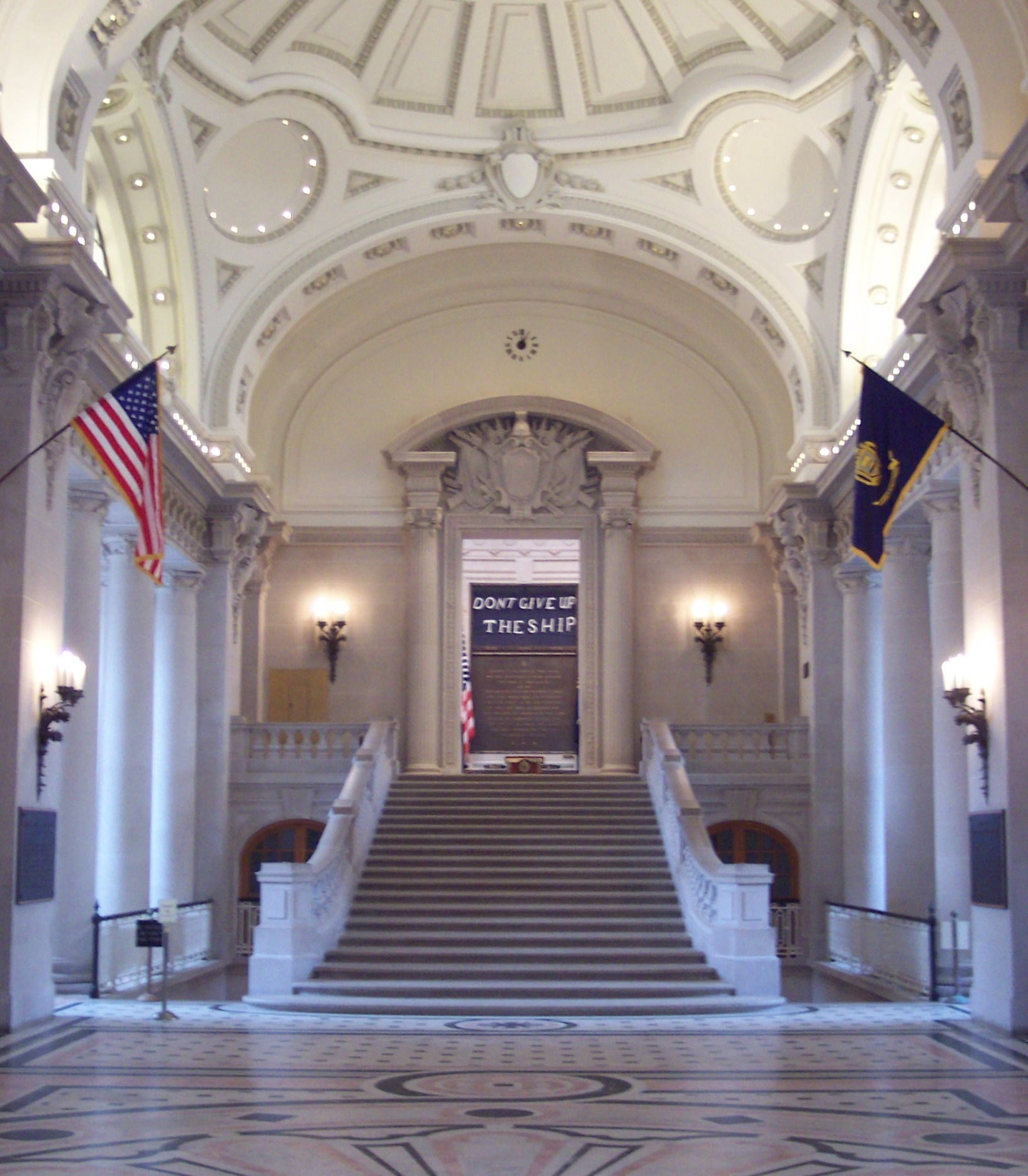
A view of the flag in Memorial Hall (in Bancroft Hall)

"Don't give up the ship!" became the battle cry of Oliver Hazard Perry. The phrase was uttered by Captain James Lawrence as he died after being wounded by enemy fire aboard the Chesapeake on June 1, 1813. Perry learned of Lawrence's demise at Presque Isle. He honored Lawrence with the name of a brig, called Lawrence. A battle flag was needed, and the words of Perry's good friend were suited for the coming days.

Margaret Forster Steuart was enlisted to make the battle flag. She was a resident of Erie, Pennsylvania, wife of Army Captain Thomas Steuart and sister to Thomas Forster, both friends of Perry's. Forster was the commander of the Erie Light Infantry that had guarded the fleet. With the help of her two daughters, three nieces, and a cousin, she had the flag ready for Perry within just a few days. As of July 2009, the flag is on display in Bancroft Hall's Memorial Hall at the U.S. Naval Academy in Annapolis.

=== Perry–Elliott controversy ===
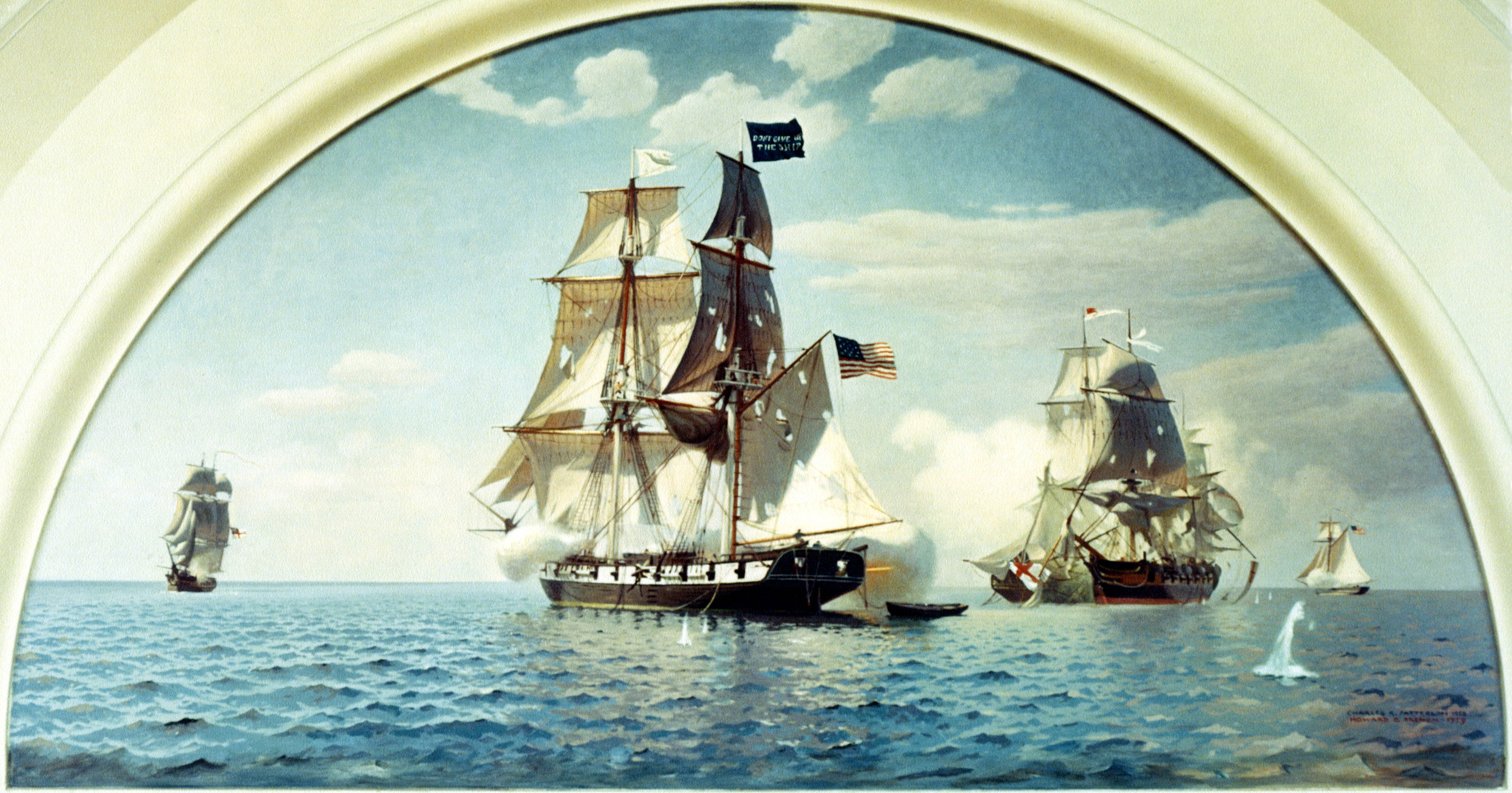
Mural: Battle of Lake Erie, September 10, 1813. (1959) by Charles Robert Patterson and Howard B. French, U.S. Naval Academy, Annapolis, Maryland. Niagara joins the battle. Detroit and Queen Charlotte at right.

While Nelson had Collingwood, Perry had Jesse Elliott, and was considerably less well served. Elliott, while serving with Isaac Chauncey at Lake Ontario, was tasked to augment Perry's squadron with 11 officers and 91 men, "and none were sent but the worst." Subsequently, detailed by Chauncey to command Niagara, Elliott stated "that if he could have foreseen that he himself should be sent to Lake Erie, his selections would have been different." Elliott then appropriated the "best of the worst" for Niagara; and Perry "in the interest of harmony" accepted the situation, though with growing ill-will.

In his initial post-action report, Perry had praised Captain Elliott's role in the American victory at Lake Erie; and as news of the battle spread, Perry and Elliott were both celebrated as national heroes. Soon after, however, several junior officers publicly criticized Elliott's performance during the battle, charging that Elliott allowed Lawrence to suffer the brunt of the British fire while holding Niagara back from the fight. William Vigneron Taylor, Perry's sailing master, in a letter to Taylor's wife, put it thus:

The Lawrence alone rec'd the fire of the whole British squadron 2 1/2 hours within pistol shot—we were not supported as we ought to have been. Captain Perry led the Lawrence into action & sustained the most destructive fire with the most gallant spirit perhaps that was ever witnessed under similar circumstances.

— William Taylor, September 15, 1813

The meeting between Elliott and Perry on the deck of Niagara was terse. Elliott inquired how the day was going. Perry replied, "Badly." Elliott then volunteered to take Perry's small boat and rally the schooners, and Perry acquiesced. As Perry turned Niagara into the battle, Elliott was not aboard. Elliott's rejoinder to history's criticism of inaction was that there had been a lack of effective signaling. Charges were filed, but not officially acted upon. Attempting to restore his honor, Elliott and his supporters began a 30-year campaign that would outlive both men and ultimately leave his reputation in tatters.

In Perry's report to Secretary of the Navy William Jones, written three days after the battle, he mentioned Elliott in what, at first, seem to be complimentary terms, but, when read carefully, betray his disdain for Elliott. Perry wrote, "In this action he evinced his characteristic bravery and judgement; and, since the close of the action, has given me the most able and essential assistance."

=== Congressional Gold Medal ===
On January 6, 1814, Perry was honored with a Congressional Gold Medal, the Thanks of Congress, and a promotion to the rank of Captain. This was one of 27 Gold Medals authorized by Congress arising from the War of 1812.

- Obverse – bust of Perry facing right surrounded by Oliverus H. Perry Princeps Stagno Eriense. ~ Classam Totam Contudit.
- Reverse depicts a sea battle scene with inscriptions:
  Viam Invenit Virtus Aut Facit
  Inter Class. Ameri.
  Et Brit Die X. Sep.
  MDCCCXIII

(Valor finds or makes a way. Between the Fleets of America and Britain September 10, 1813.)

Elliott was also recognized with a Congressional Gold Medal and the Thanks of Congress for his actions in the battle. This recognition would prove to fan the flames of resentment on both sides of the Elliott–Perry controversy.

In recognition of his victory at Lake Erie, in 1813 Perry was elected as an honorary member of the New York Society of the Cincinnati.

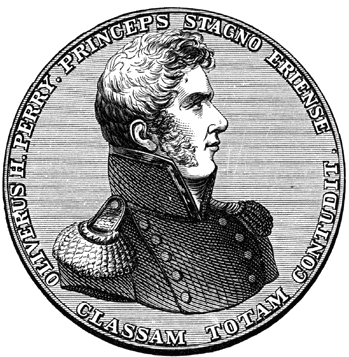
The front of the Perry medal

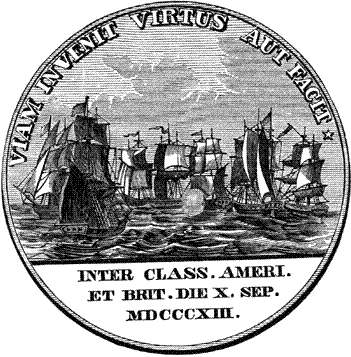
The back of the Perry medal

== Later commands and controversies ==
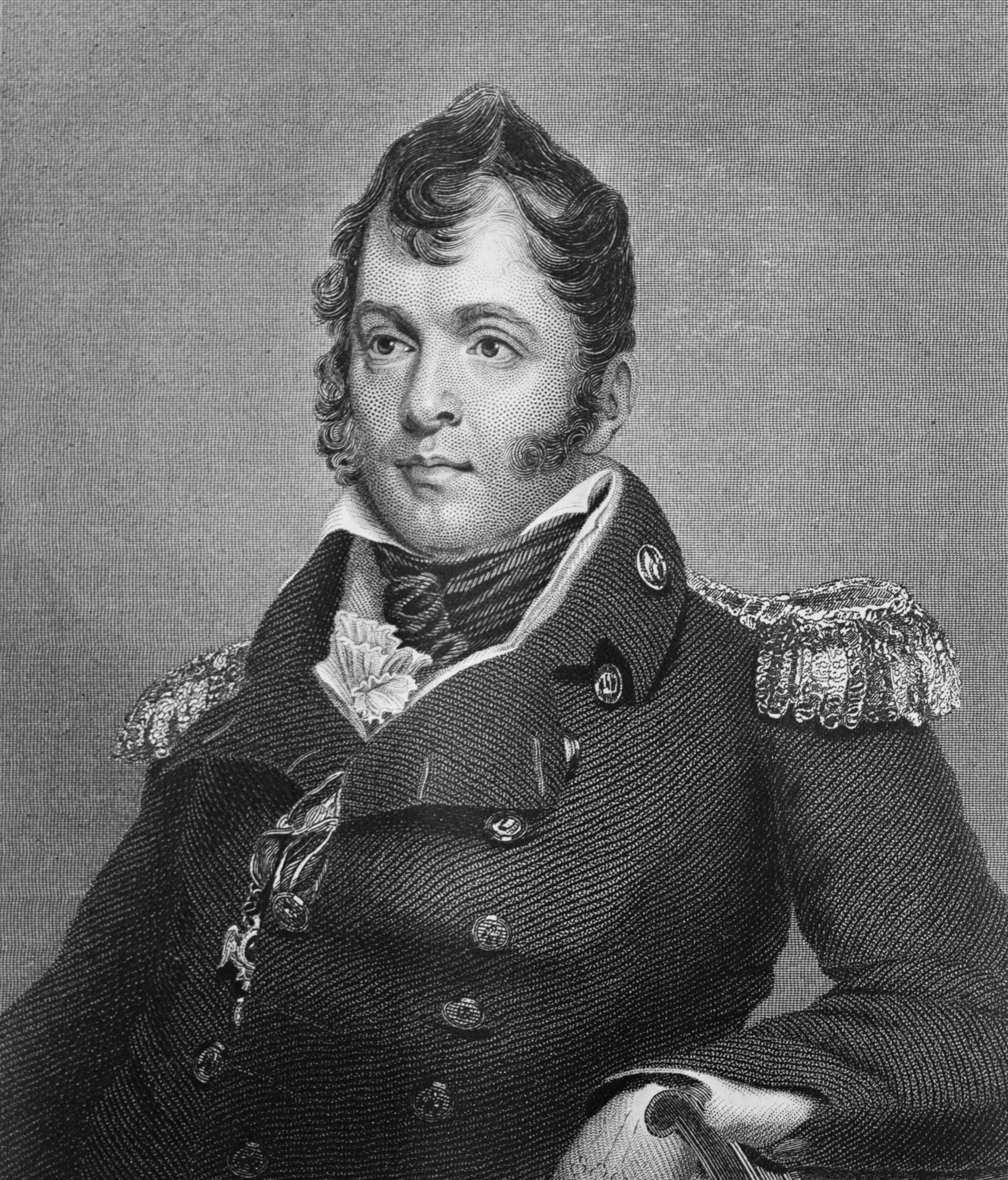
United States Navy engraved portrait of Commodore Perry

In May 1814, Perry took command of a squadron of seven gunboats based in Newport. He held this command for only two months as in July he was placed in command of USS Java, a 44-gun frigate which was under construction in Baltimore. While overseeing the outfitting of Java, Perry participated in the defenses of Baltimore and Washington, D.C., during the British invasion of the Chesapeake Bay. In a twist of irony, these land battles would be the last time the career naval officer saw combat. The Treaty of Ghent was ratified before Java could be put to sea.

For Perry, the post-war years were marred by controversies. In 1815, he commanded Java in the Mediterranean during the Second Barbary War. While moored in Naples, Perry slapped the commander of the ship's Marines, Captain John Heath, whom Perry charged with "disrespectful, insolent, and contemptuous conduct to me his superior officer". The ensuing court-martial found both men guilty, but levied only mild reprimands. After the crew returned home, Heath challenged Perry to a pistol duel, which was fought on October 19, 1817, on the same field in Weehawken, New Jersey where Aaron Burr shot and killed Alexander Hamilton. Heath fired first and missed. Perry declined to return fire, satisfying the Marine's honor.

Perry's return from the Mediterranean also reignited the feud with Elliott. After an exchange of angry letters, Elliott challenged Perry to a duel, which Perry refused. (While it was normally considered cowardly to refuse a duel, Perry's reputation resulted in few feeling that Perry had wrongly offended Elliott's honor.) He instead, on August 8, 1818, filed formal court-martial charges against Elliott. Perry filed a total of six charges and twenty-one specifications including "conduct unbecoming an officer," and failure to "do his utmost to take or destroy the vessel of the enemy which it was his duty to encounter."

Wishing to avoid a scandal between two decorated naval heroes, Secretary of the Navy Smith Thompson and President James Monroe suppressed the matter by offering Perry a diplomatic mission to South America in exchange for dropping his charges. This put an official end to the controversy, though it would continue to be debated for another quarter century.

== Mission to Venezuela and death ==
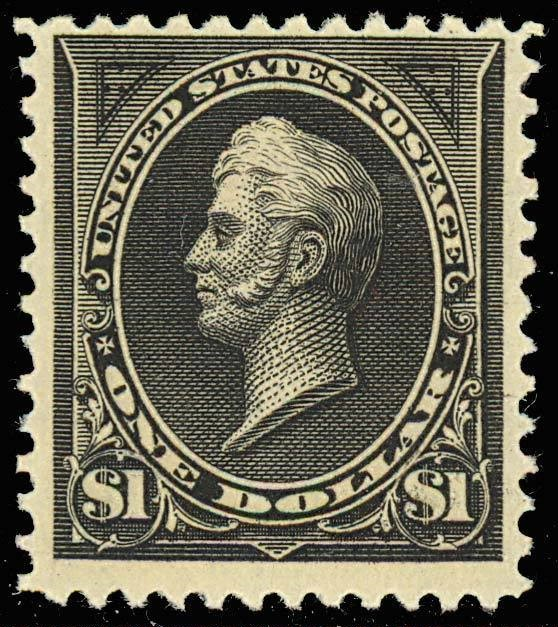
Oliver Hazard Perry Issue of 1894

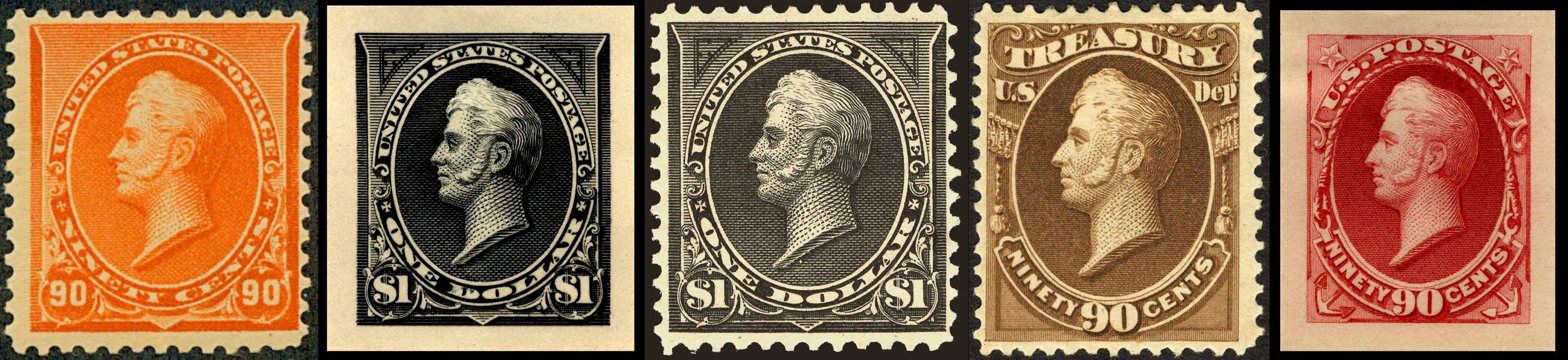
Other stamps depicting Perry

In the spring of 1819 Secretary of the Navy Smith Thompson selected Commodore Oliver Hazard Perry for the mission of establishing friendly relations with the government of newly independent Venezuela and negotiating to obtain restitution for United States schooners Tiger and Liberty that the Venezuelans had illegally taken during the revolution two years before. In June 7, by order of President James Monroe Perry sailed from Annapolis for the Orinoco River, Venezuela, aboard of the frigate John Adams with the frigate Constellation and the schooner USS Nonsuch, arriving on July 15 at Port Of Spain to discourage piracy in the Caribbean basin, while still maintaining friendly relations with Republic of Venezuela and the Republic of Buenos Aires. Shifting his flag to USS Nonsuch, due to its shallower draft, Perry sailed upriver to Angostura to negotiate an anti-piracy agreement with President Simón Bolívar. After the restitution of the two American ships a favorable treaty was signed on August 11 with Vice President Francisco Antonio Zea in the absence of Bolivar (who was engaged in the liberation of New Granada), but when the USS Nonsuch started downriver, many of her crew, including Perry, had been stricken with yellow fever.

Despite the crew's efforts to reach Trinidad for medical assistance, the commodore died on board USS Nonsuch on August 23, 1819, his 34th birthday, as the ship entered the Gulf of Paria and was nearing Port of Spain. He was buried in Port of Spain.

His remains were later taken back to the United States in 1826 and interred in Newport, Rhode Island. Originally interred in the Old Common Burial Ground, his body was eventually moved to Newport's Island Cemetery.

Perry Street in Savannah, Georgia, is named in his honor.

== Family ==
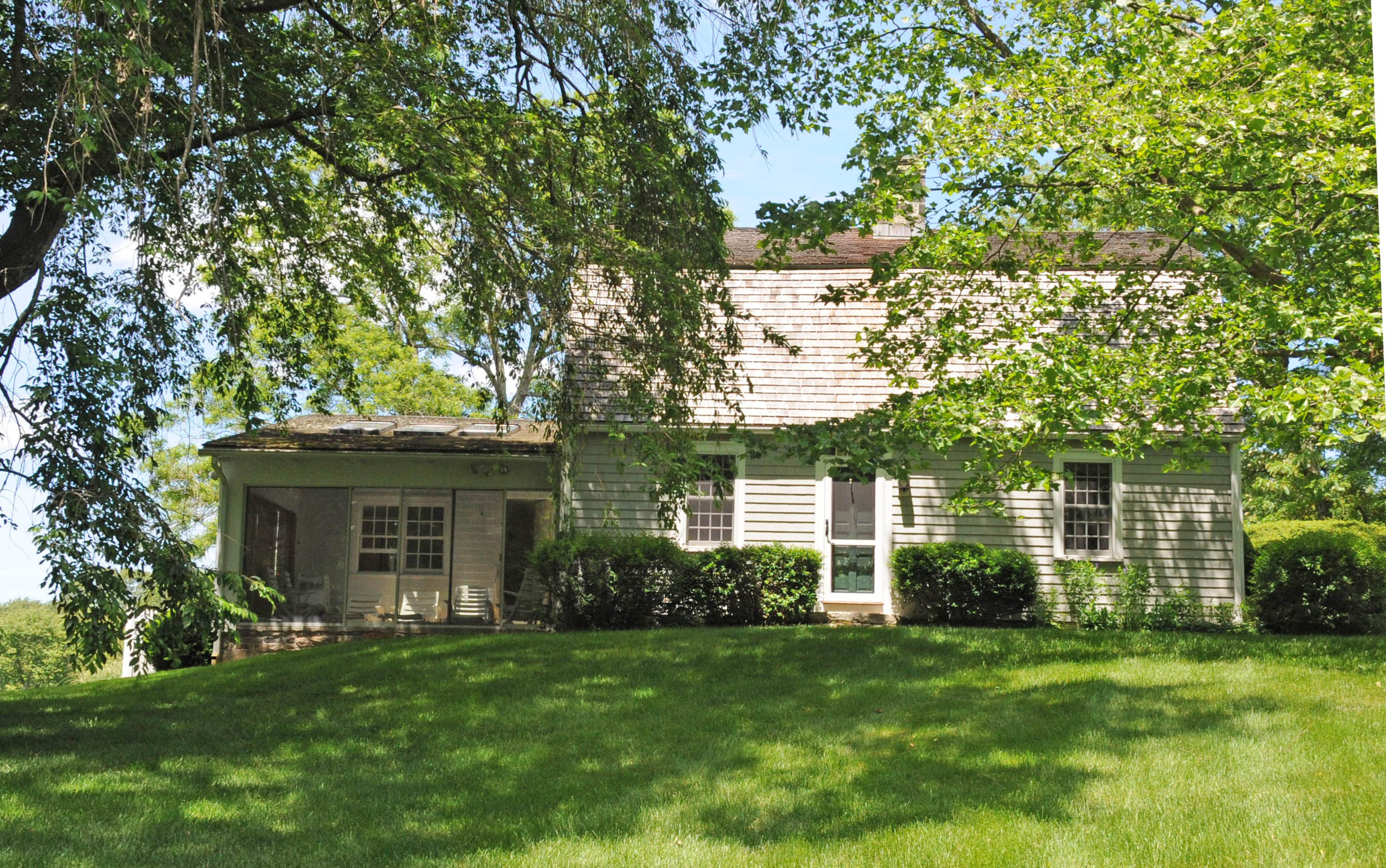
Commodore Oliver Perry Farm in Rhode Island

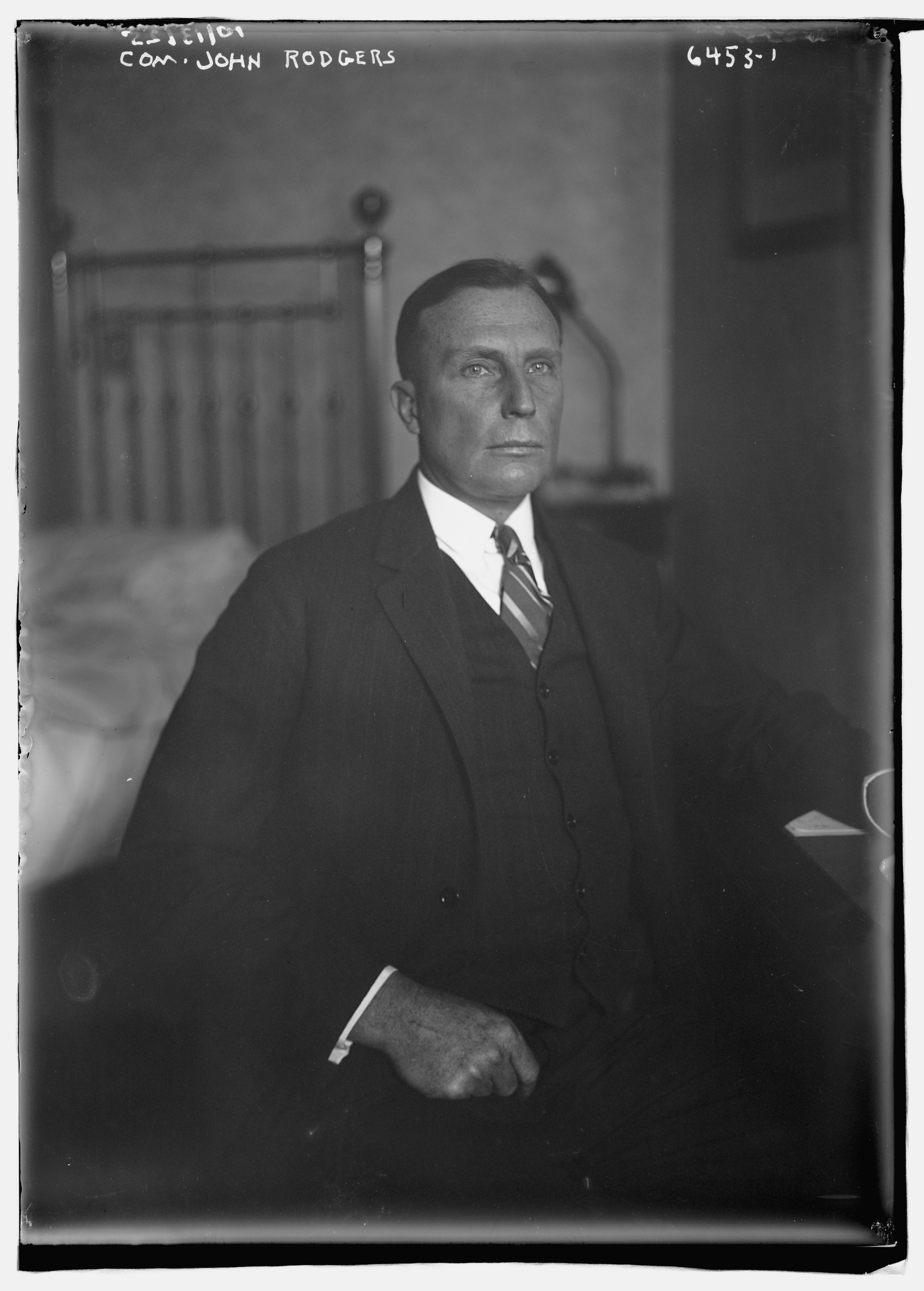
Commander John Rodgers was a great-grandnephew of Oliver Hazard Perry.

Perry married Elizabeth Champlin Mason in 1811. They had five children, four of whom lived to maturity. They were:

1. Christopher Grant Champlin Perry (1812–1854), a physician and Brigadier General who married Muriel Frances Sergeant of Philadelphia (great-granddaughter of Benjamin Franklin); their daughter Margaret Mason Perry married the artist John LaFarge.
2. Oliver Hazard Perry II (1813–1814), who died in infancy.
3. Oliver Hazard Perry, Jr. (1815–1878), a Lieutenant in the Navy who married Elizabeth Ann Randolph. After her death in 1847, he married Mary Ann Moseley.
4. Christopher Raymond Perry (1816–1848), a First Lieutenant who died unmarried.
5. Elizabeth Mason Perry (1819–1878), who married, as his second wife, the Rev. Francis Vinton, rector of Trinity Episcopal Church in Newport.

Perry's son Christopher Grant Champlin Perry was a physician, and served as commander of the Artillery Company of Newport from April 1848 until his death in 1854. In May 1849 he was commissioned as a Brigadier General in the Rhode Island Militia and given command of the 1st Brigade encompassing Newport and Bristol Counties.

Perry's son Oliver Hazard Perry, Jr. entered the Navy as a midshipman in 1829, rose to the rank of lieutenant and resigned in 1849. He served on the United States Exploring Expedition under Captain Charles Wilkes from 1839 to 1842. Although he is buried in the same cemetery as his parents, for unknown reasons, he is not buried in the same plot with his parents.

Perry's son Christopher Raymond Perry graduated from the United States Military Academy at West Point in 1842. He served during the Mexican War and fought at the Battle of Palo Alto on May 8, 1846, and at the Battle of Resaca-de‑la‑Palma on May 9, 1846. He died on active duty as a 1st lieutenant in 1848.

== Dates of rank ==
- Midshipman – April 7, 1799
- Lieutenant – January 15, 1807
- Master Commandant – August 28, 1812
- Captain – September 10, 1813

Although Perry is often referred to as "Commodore Perry," it should be kept in mind that, prior to the American Civil War, commodore was not a rank in the U.S. Navy but, rather, the title of an officer in command of a squadron of two or more ships. Perry first held the title of commodore when he took command of the Lake Erie squadron in 1813.

== Assignments ==
- Midshipman, USS General Greene – April 1799 to May 1801
- Acting Lieutenant, USS Adams – June 1802 to November 1803
- Second Lieutenant, USS Constellation – May 1804 to July 1805
- First Lieutenant, USS Nautilus – July 1805 to December 1805
- Acting Lieutenant, USS Constitution – December 1805 to c. July 1806
- Second Lieutenant, USS Essex – c. July 1806 to c. October 1806
- Officer in Charge of Gunboat construction in Newport and Westerly, RI – October 1806 to April 1809
- Commanding Officer, USS Revenge – April 1809 to January 1811
- Commanding Officer, Gunboat Squadron, Newport, RI – c. 1811 to January 1813
- Commanding Officer, Lake Erie Squadron – March 1813 to c. October 1813
- Commanding Officer, Gunboat squadron, Newport, RI – May 1814 to July 1814
- Commanding Officer, USS Java (under construction) – July 1814 to August 1815
- Commanding Officer, USS Java (in commission) – August 1815 to c. May 1817
- Senior Naval Officer, Newport, RI – c. May 1817 to May 1819
- Commanding Officer, Venezuelan diplomatic mission – June 1819 to August 1819 (deceased)

Note – Time gaps between assignments were probably in a "waiting orders" status.

== Geographical namesakes ==
Many locations in the United States are named in his honor, including:

- Oliver Hazard Perry School, Boston Massachusetts
- Perry Traditional Academy, Pittsburgh, Pennsylvania
- Perrysville Avenue (Old Rt. 19 connection), Pittsburgh, Pennsylvania
- Perry North (Observatory Hill) and Perry South (Perry Hilltop) neighborhoods on the Northside section in the city of Pittsburgh, Pennsylvania
- Oliver Hazard Perry Elementary School, Cleveland, Ohio
- Perry Elementary School, Erie, Pennsylvania
- P.S. 34 Oliver H. Perry Elementary School, Brooklyn, New York
- Commodore Perry School District, including Perry Township, Mercer County, Pennsylvania
- Oliver Hazard Perry Middle School, Providence, Rhode Island
- Oliver Hazard Perry Elementary School, San Diego, California
- Training Ship Oliver Hazard Perry, Newport, Rhode Island
- All of the ten Perry counties in the U.S.
- Perryville and Perry County, Missouri
- The hamlet of Perrysburg and the surrounding township; and the Village of Perry, New York and the surrounding township
- The city of Perry, Michigan in Perry Township
- The city of Perry, Georgia
- The town of Perry, Maine
- The village of Perry, Illinois
- The cities of Perrysburg, (Note: There is a monument of him on the river near the PYC (Perrysburg Yacht Club). This town also is the home of Fort Meigs) Perrysville, North Perry and Perry; Perrysburg Township; and Perry County, Ohio
- The unincorporated hamlet of South Perry in Perry Township, Hocking County, Ohio
- Perry Township, between Canton and Massillon in Stark County, Ohio. The local high school is also named in his honor.
- The borough of Perryopolis and Oliver Township, within Perry County, and Oliver Township and Perry Township in Jefferson County, Pennsylvania
- The village of Perryville in the town of South Kingstown, Rhode Island The portion of U.S. Route 1 near Perryville is named the Commodore Oliver Hazard Perry Highway. Perry Street in Newport is also named after him.
- The City of Hazard in Perry County, Kentucky
- Perry County, Tennessee
- Perry Street, New York
- Fort Perry in Box Springs, Georgia
- Commodore Downs Thoroughbred race track in Fairview Township on the western edge of Erie, Pennsylvania (1973–1983).
- The Inn at Perry Cabin, St. Michaels, Maryland
- An eastbound service plaza along the Ohio Turnpike is named the Commodore Perry Service Plaza, located in Sandusky County, Ohio
- Perry Square in Erie, Pennsylvania

== Monuments ==
The national monument commemorating Perry is the Perry's Victory and International Peace Memorial in the village of Put-In-Bay, Ohio on South Bass Island, Ohio. Its 352 ft (107 m) tower, the world's most massive Doric column, was constructed by a multi-state commission between 1912 and 1915.

Other monuments include:

- Memorial plaque, Trinity Episcopal Church, Newport, Rhode Island, dedicated by Perry's widow on August 23, 1855, the 36th anniversary of his death.
- Perry Monument, Public Square, Cleveland, Ohio, monument and statue by William Walcutt, dedicated on September 10, 1860, the 47th anniversary of the Battle of Lake Erie. Walcutt's marble statue was replaced with a bronze copy in 1929. The monument was relocated to Fort Huntington Park in 1991.
  - Walcutt's marble Perry statue is on long-term loan to the Perry's Victory and International Peace Memorial.
- Oliver Hazard Perry by William Greene Turner, Eisenhower Park, Newport, Rhode Island, dedicated September 10, 1885, the 72nd anniversary of the Battle of Lake Erie.
- Oliver Hazard Perry by Charles Henry Niehaus, Front Park, Buffalo, New York, dedicated on September 25, 1916.
- Perry Monument, Perry Square, Erie, Pennsylvania designed by Paul Philippe Cret, 1925, features a bronze copy after William Greene Turner's 1885 statue.
- Oliver Hazard Perry Memorial Gateway, Port-of-Spain, Trinidad, dedicated April 1925. Captain Henry E. Lackey, the United States Navy representative at the dedication, arrived aboard the newly commissioned light cruiser USS Memphis (CL-13).
- Perry Monument at Misery Bay, Presque Isle State Park, Erie, Pennsylvania dedicated in 1926.
- Oliver Hazard Perry (bronze copy after William Walcutt), on the south front of the Rhode Island State House, Providence, Rhode Island, dedicated in 1928.
- Perry Monument, Perrysburg, Ohio, dedicated in 1997, features a bronze copy after William Walcutt's 1860 statue.
- The reverse of the 2013 "Perry's Victory" quarter shows William Walcutt's statue of Perry (1860) with the Perry's Victory and International Peace Memorial in the distance.
- The family farm in South Kingstown, where Perry was probably born and later built a house, was listed on the National Register of Historic Places in 1982.
- A larger than life portrait of Commodore Perry hangs in the Executive Chamber of the Rhode Island State House.
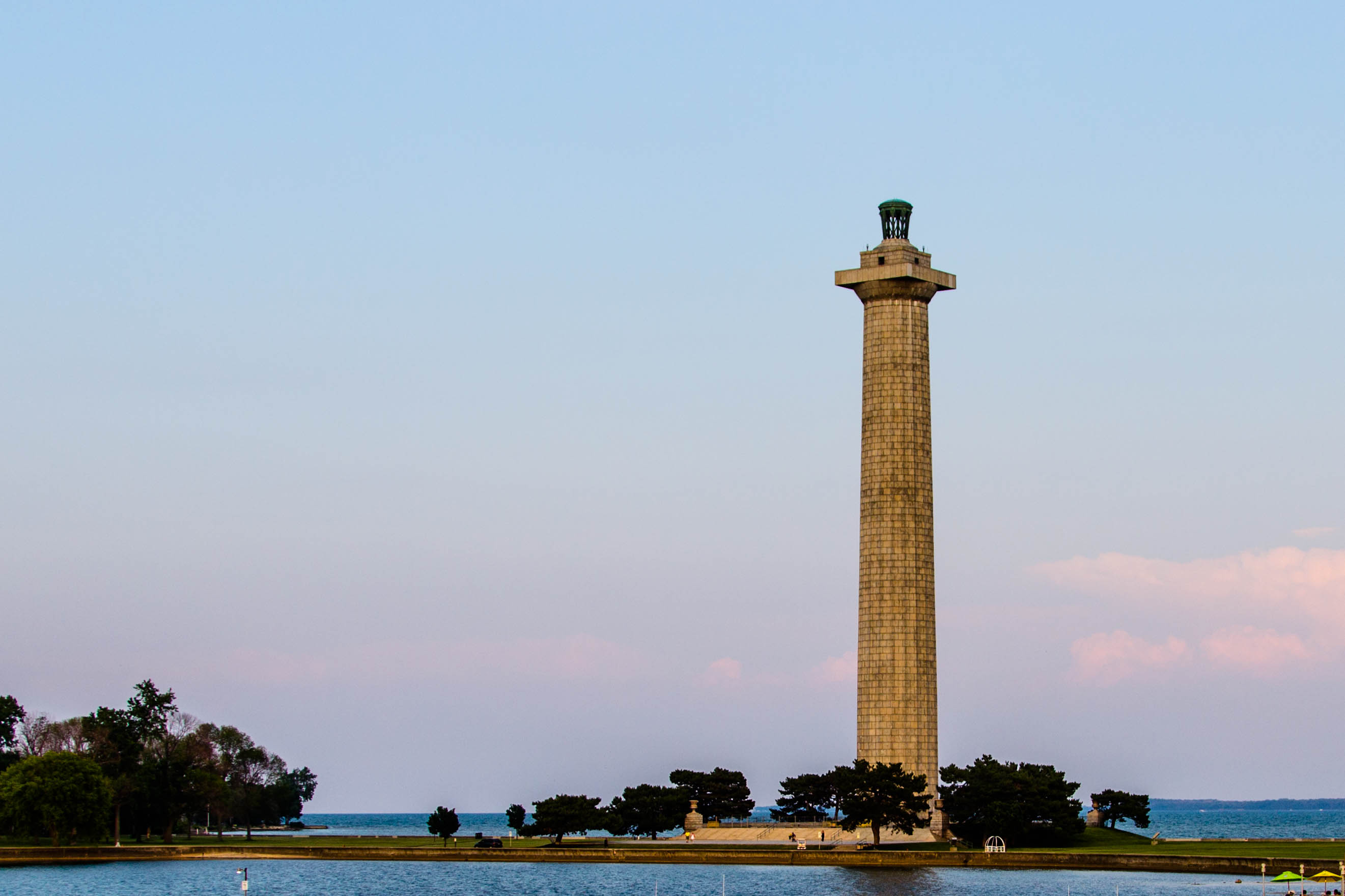
Perry's Victory and International Peace Memorial (1912–1915), Put-In-Bay, Ohio on South Bass Island

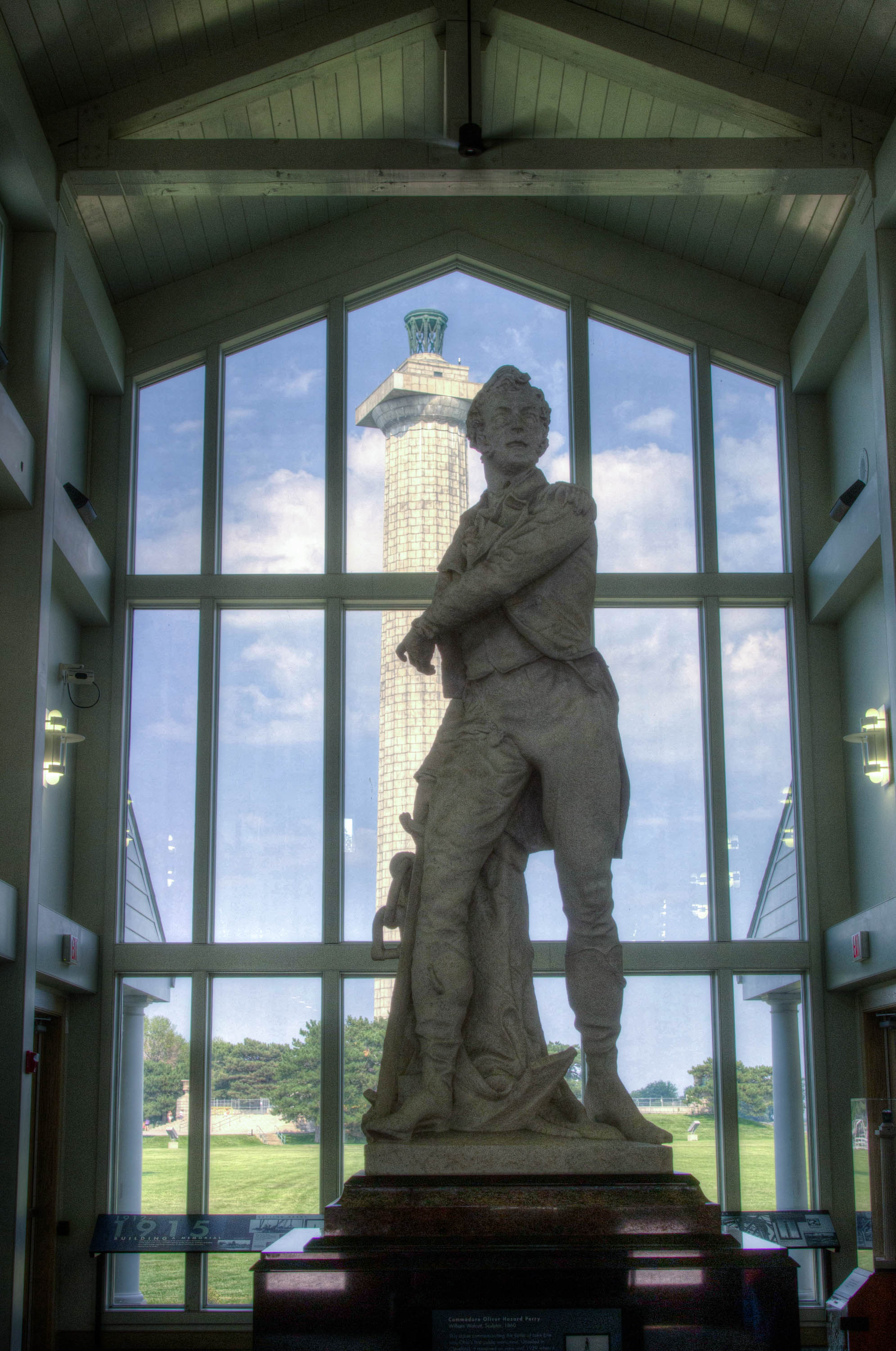
Oliver Hazard Perry (1860), by William Walcutt, Perry's Victory and International Peace Memorial

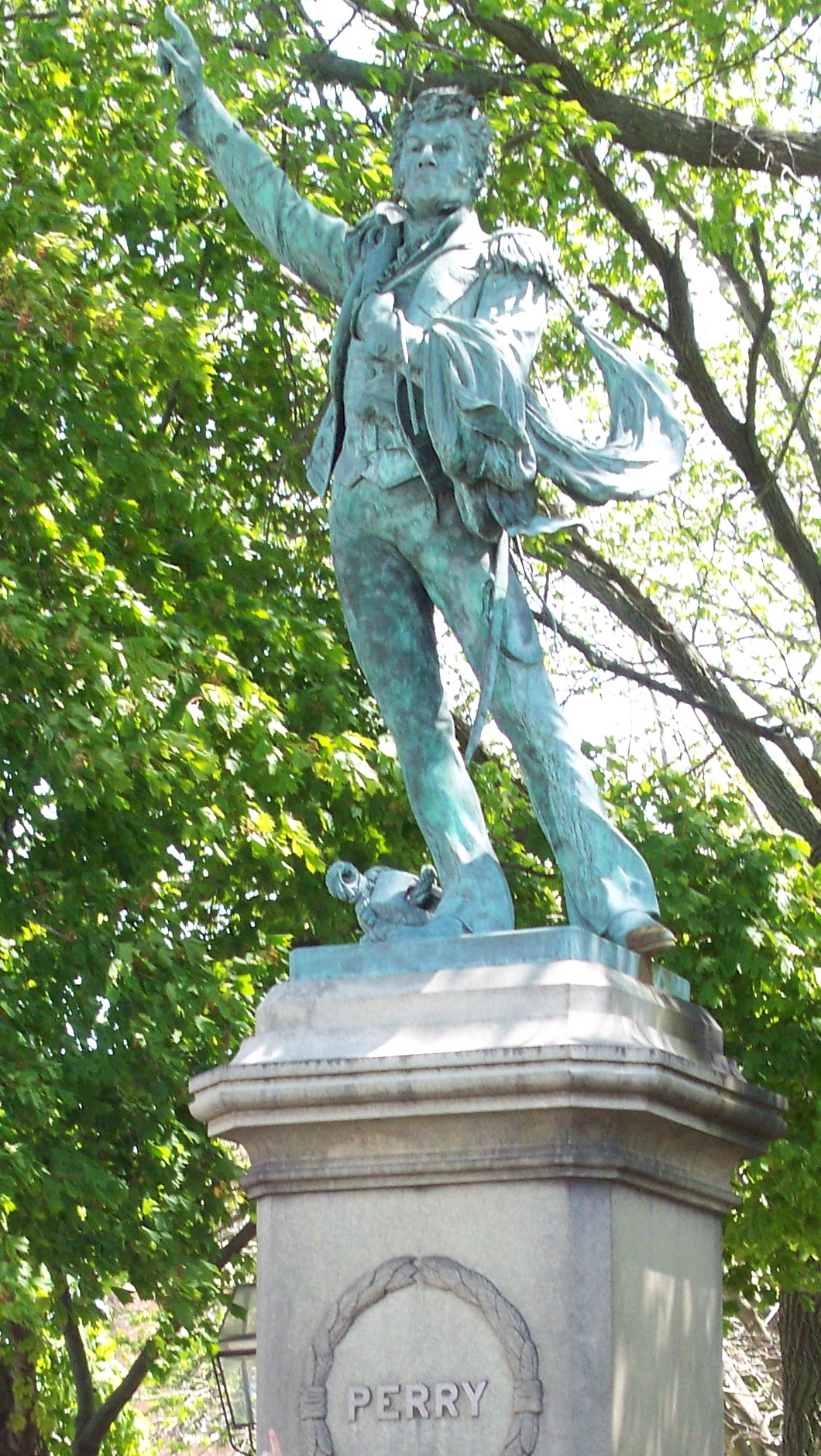
Oliver Hazard Perry (1885), by William Greene Turner, Newport, Rhode Island

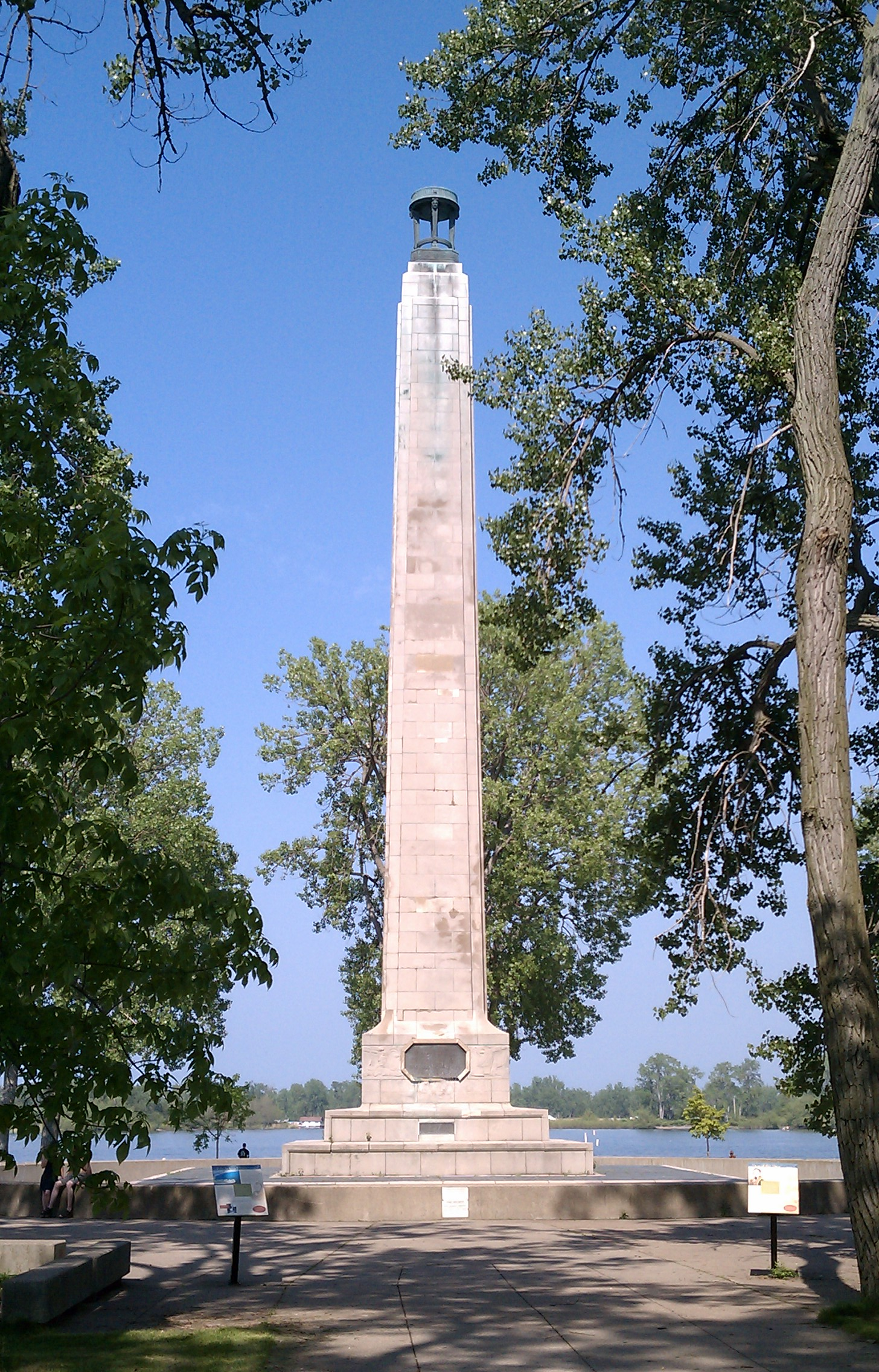
Perry Monument (1926), Presque Isle, Erie, Pennsylvania

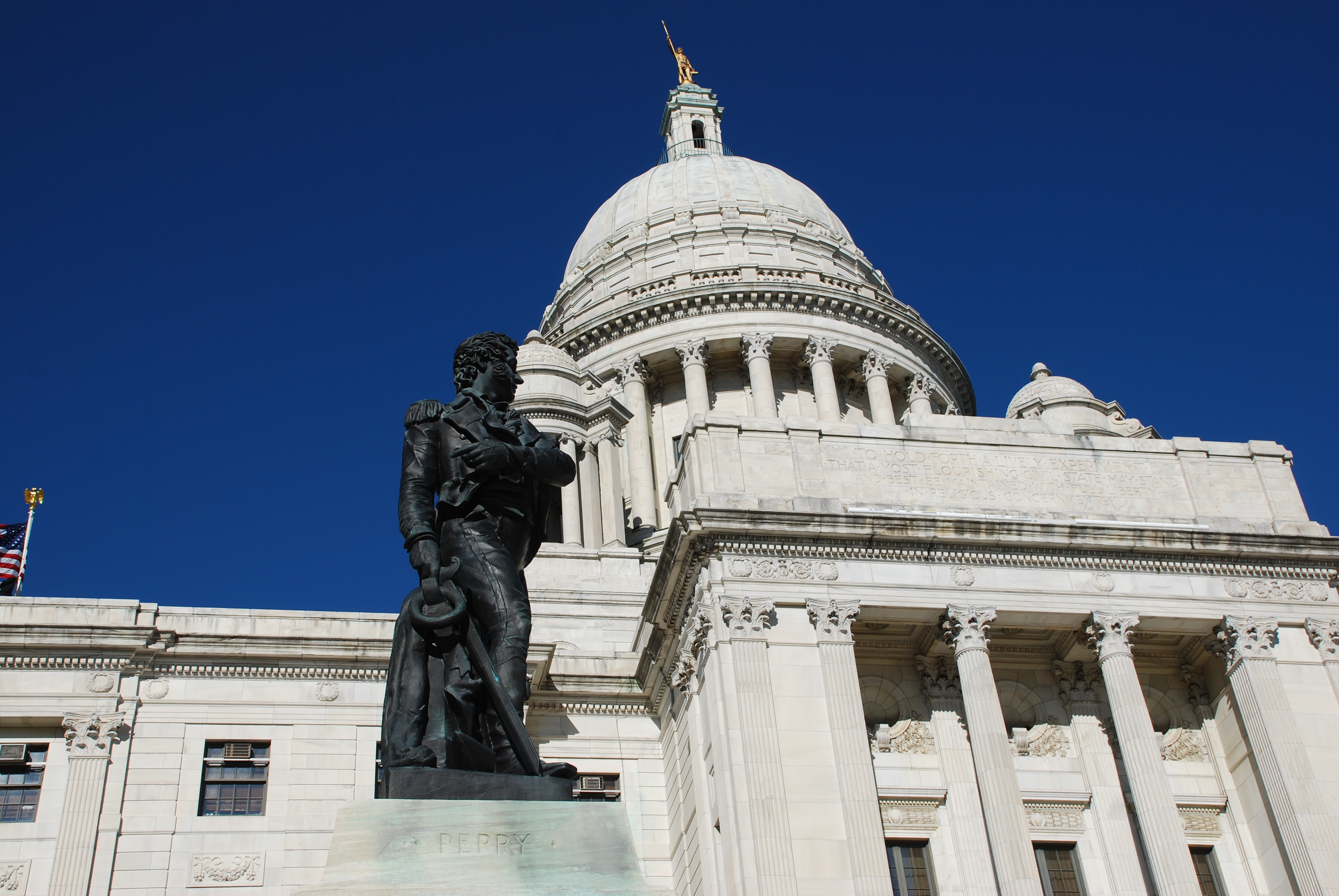
Perry statue (1928), Rhode Island State House

== Paintings ==
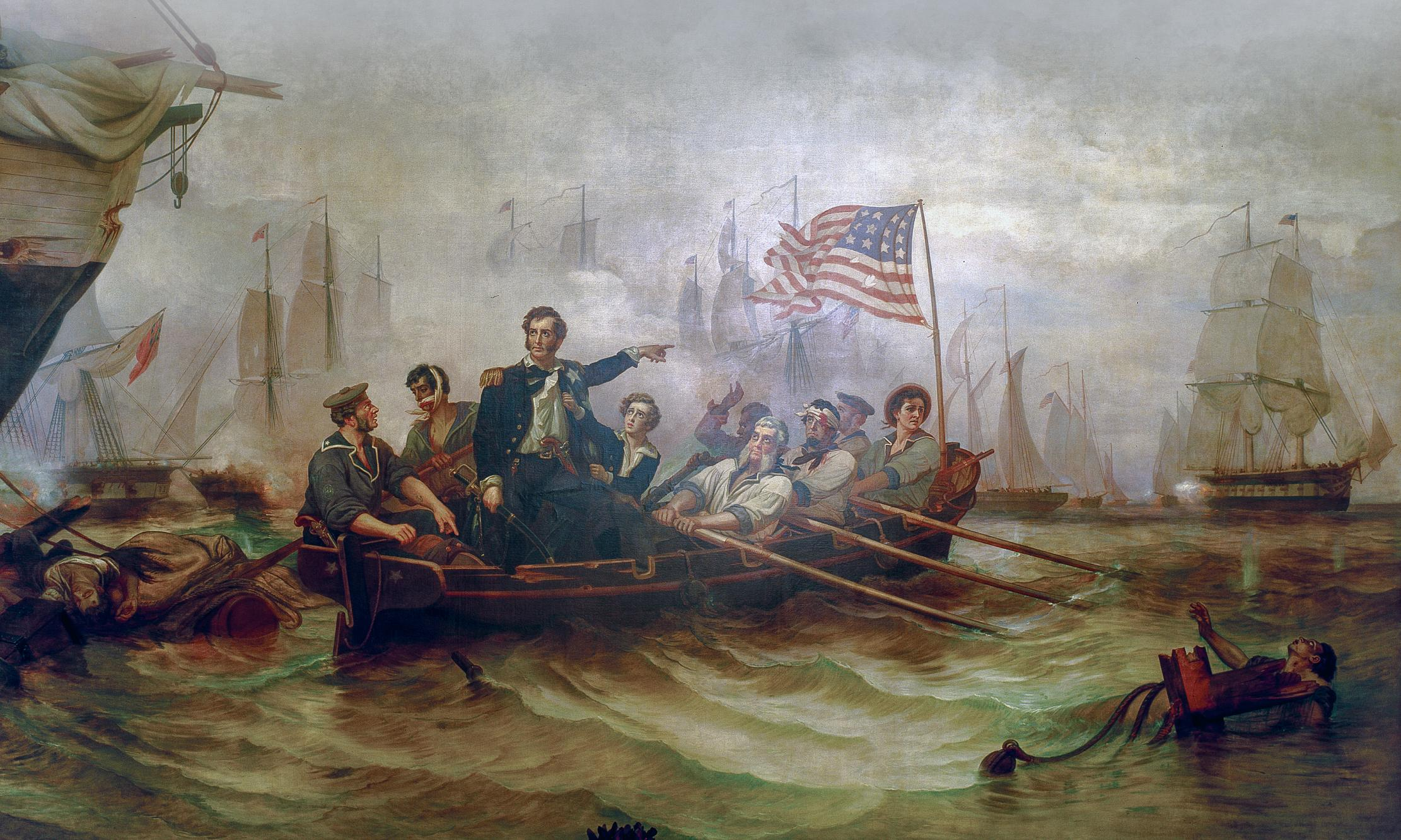
Battle of Lake Erie (1873) by William Henry Powell

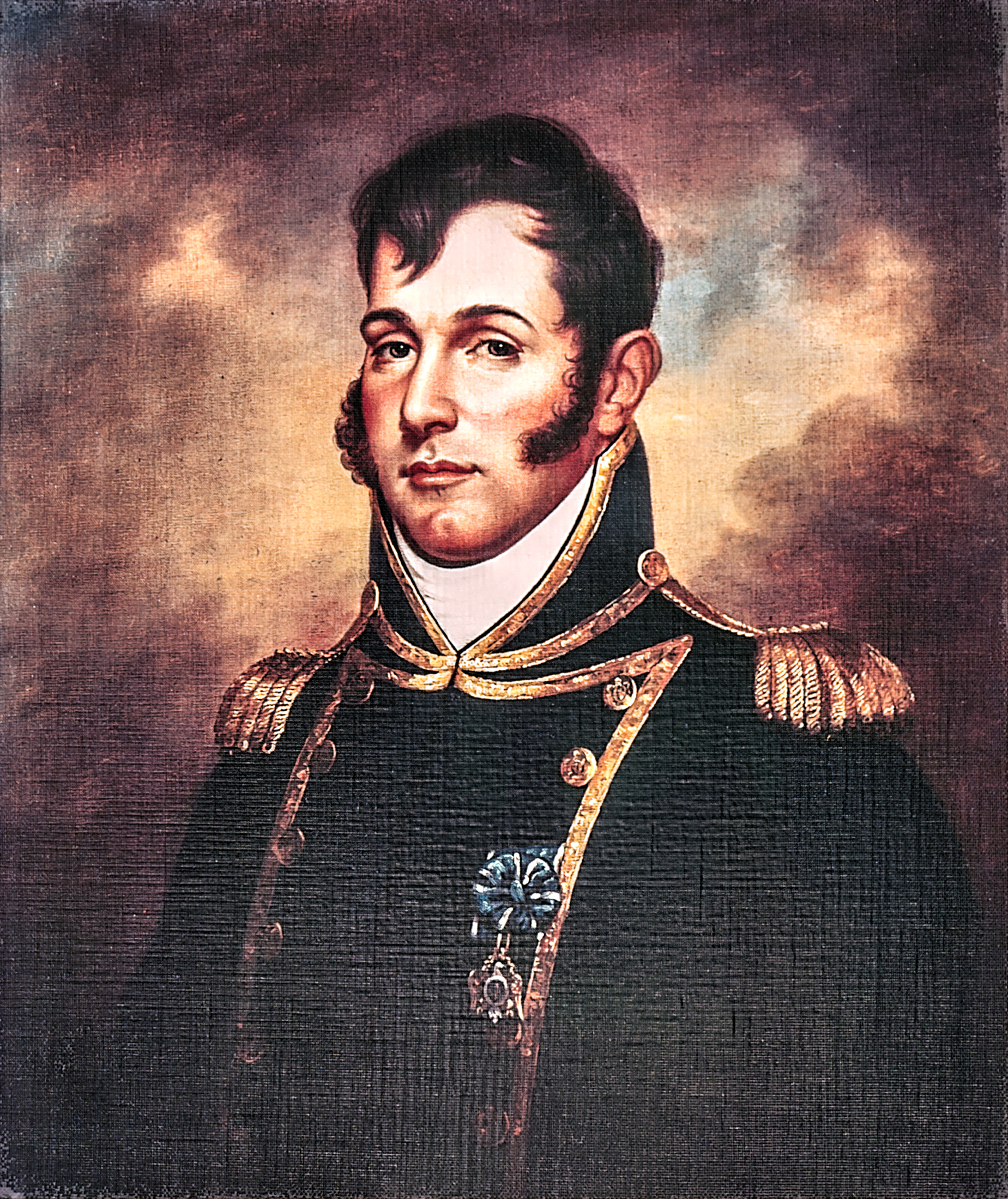
Painting at the Perry Area Historical Museum in Perry, Georgia

- "Commodore Oliver Hazard Perry" (1818–1828) by Gilbert Stuart and Jane Stuart, Toledo Museum of Art, Toledo, Ohio
- Perry's Victory on Lake Erie (1865) by William Henry Powell, Rotunda, Ohio Statehouse, Columbus, Ohio. Dimensions: 12 ft × 16 ft (3.7 m × 4.9 m).
- Battle of Lake Erie (1873) by William Henry Powell, United States Capitol, Washington D.C. Dimensions: 16.76 ft × 26.63 ft (5.11 m × 8.12 m).
- Portrait of Oliver Hazard Perry (1900), by Gari Melchers, Executive Chamber, Rhode Island State House
- Battle of Lake Erie (c. 1911) by Edward Percy Moran
- Battle of Lake Erie, September 10, 1813 (1959), by Charles Robert Patterson and Howard B. French, United States Naval Academy, Annapolis, Maryland

== Documentary ==
In 2016, principal photography began on We Have Met the Enemy, a feature-length documentary produced by Lou Reda (Vietnam in HD, The Blue and the Gray), for a planned spring 2017 release.

== Eponymous ships ==
Commodore Perry has been repeatedly honored with ships bearing his name.

- USS Perry (1843), a sailing brig 1843–1865
- USS Commodore Perry (1859), an armed side-wheel ferry built in 1859 by Stack and Joyce, Williamsburg, New York and purchased by the Navy on October 2, 1861; and commissioned later in the month, Acting Master F. J. Thomas was in command
- USS Perry (DD-11), a Bainbridge-class destroyer (1900–1919)
- USS Perry (DD-340), a Clemson-class destroyer converted into a high-speed minesweeper and re-designated DMS–17 effective November 19, 1940. Served 1921–1944; sunk in Battle of Peleliu.
- SS Oliver Hazard Perry, a Liberty ship. See List of Liberty ships (M–R).
- USS Perry (DD-844), a Gearing-class destroyer (1945–1970)
- USS Oliver Hazard Perry (FFG-7), a guided-missile frigate (1976–1997), and the Oliver Hazard Perry-class frigates, of which it was a member, are named in his honor. The Navy built 51 of the Oliver Hazard Perry-class frigates, with the first going into service in 1977, and the last to be finally moth-balled in 2015. See also USS Perry.
- SSV Oliver Hazard Perry, a Rhode Island Educational Foundation tall ship

== Popular song ==
In 1820, Anthony Philip Heinrich wrote a song, "Ode to the Memory of Commodore O. H. Perry", with words by Henry C. Lewis.

== See also ==
- USS Niagara (1813)
- The Perry Family
- Jesse Elliot
- Matthew C. Perry
- List of books about the War of 1812
- Bibliography of early American naval history

== Bibliography ==
- Barnes, James (1912). The hero of Erie: (Oliver Hazard Perry). New York, London: D. Appleton & Company. p. 167.
- Bloom, Loren (2008). "The Battle of Lake Erie: Julian Oliver Davidson's Painting" (Oliver Hazard Perry – Hero). Erie Maritime Museum. Archived from the original on November 6, 2020.
- Brown, John Howard (2006). The Cyclopaedia of American Biography: Comprising the Men and Women of the United States ..., V6. Kessinger Publishing. p. 700. ISBN 978-1-4254-8629-7., Book
- Capace, Nancy (2001). The Encyclopedia of Rhode Island. St. Clair Shores, Michigan: Somerset Publishers, Inc. p. https://books.google.com/books?id=qHPYeCvnASoC&q=1761+Milestone&pg=PA368. ISBN 978-0-403-09610-7.
- Mackenzie, Alexander Slidell (1910). Commodore Oliver Hazard Perry. New York, NY/Akron, OH: D.M. MacLellan Book Company. p. 443.
- Mackenzie, Alexander Slidell (1840). The life of Commodore Oliver Hazard Perry. Vol. 1. New York: Harper & Brothers. p. 443.
- Paullin, Charles Edward (1918). The Battle of Lake Erie (a collection of documents, mainly those by Oliver Hazard Perry). Cleveland, Ohio: The Raufin Club.
- Potter, Elmer Belmont (1981). Sea Power: A Naval History. Naval Institute Press. p. 419. ISBN 978-0-87021-607-7., Book
- Skaggs, David Curtis (2006). Oliver Hazard Perry: honor, courage, and patriotism in the early U.S. Navy. Naval Institute Press. p. 302. ISBN 978-1-59114-792-3.
- Skaggs, David Curtis; Altoff, Gerard T. (2000). A Signal Victory: The Lake Erie Campaign, 1812–1813. Naval Institute Press. p. 264. ISBN 978-1-55750-892-8.
- Snowden, James Ross (1861). A Description of the Medals of Washington; and of other Objects of Interest in the Museum of the Mint. Illustrated, to which are added Biographical Notices of the Directors of the Mint from 1792 to the year 1851. Philadelphia, Pennsylvania: J. B. Lippincott & Co. pp. 83–84.
- White, James T. (1895). Oliver Hazard Perry. National Cyclopaedia of American Biography. p. 288.
