= Perry Township, Mercer County, Pennsylvania =

Township in Pennsylvania, US

Coordinates: 41°24′00″N 80°15′29″W

- Township
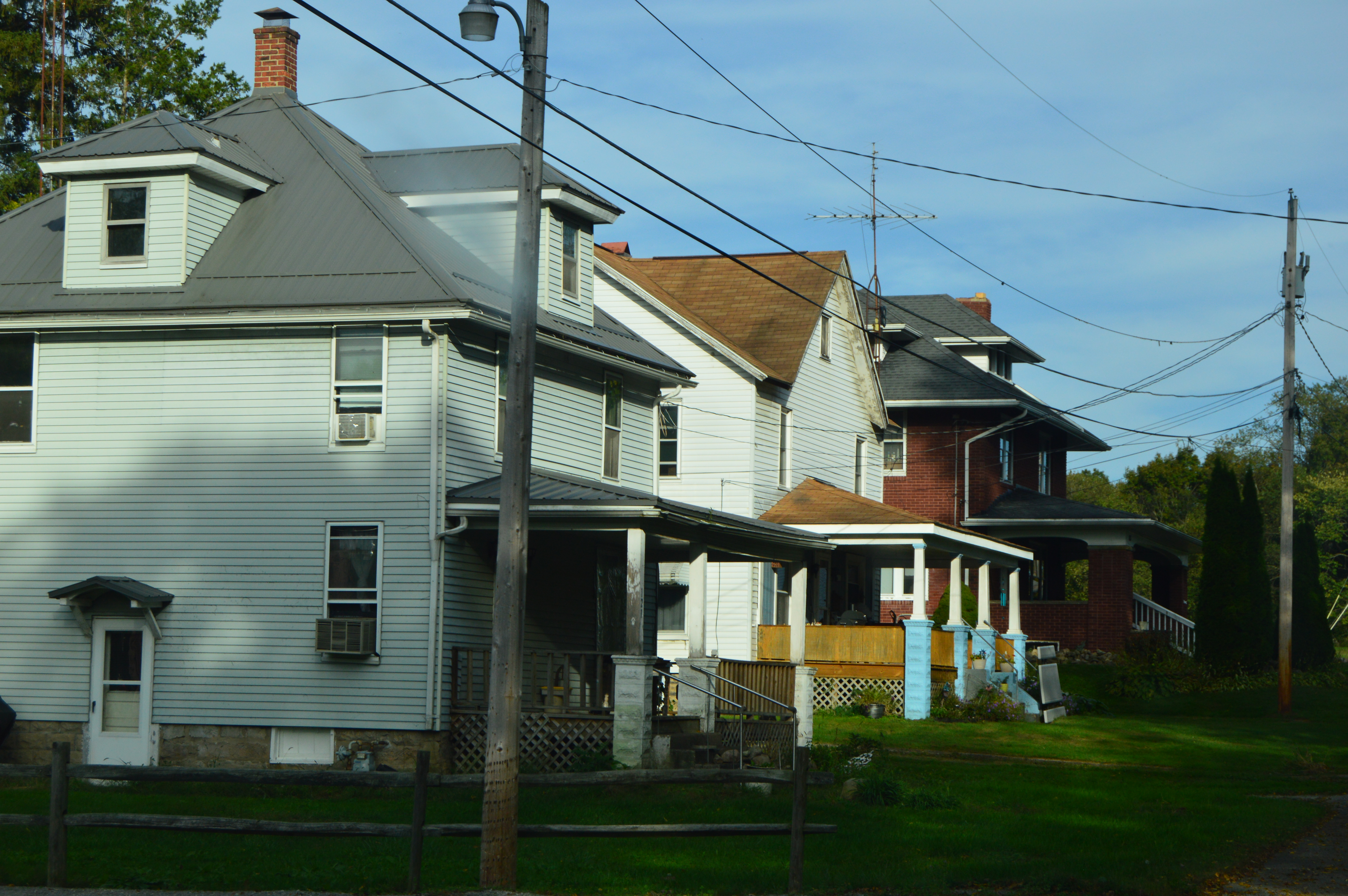
- Loper Road at Hadley

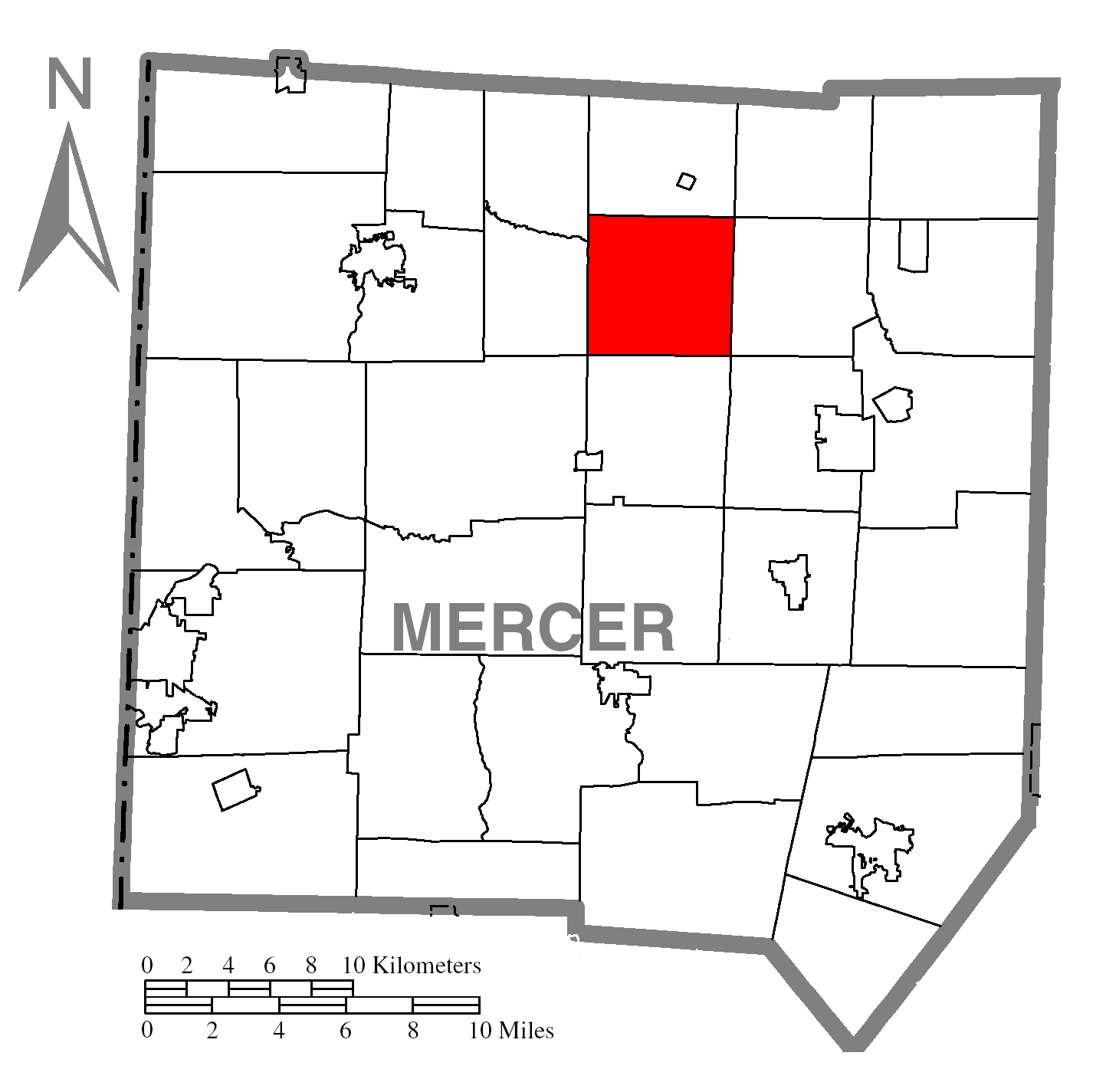
- Location of Perry Township in Mercer County

- Location of Mercer County in Pennsylvania
- Country: United States
- State: Pennsylvania
- County: Mercer County

Area
  - Total: 18.01 sq mi (46.64 km^{2})
  - Land: 18.00 sq mi (46.62 km^{2})
  - Water: 0.0077 sq mi (0.02 km^{2})

Population (2020)
  - Total: 1,332
  - Estimate (2022): 1,312
  - Density: 77.5/sq mi (29.92/km^{2})
- Time zone: UTC-4 (EST)
  - Summer (DST): UTC-5 (EDT)
- Area code: 724
- FIPS code: 42-085-59496

Historical population
Census	Pop.	Note	%±
2000	1,471		—
2010	1,453		−1.2%
2020	1,332		−8.3%
2022 (est.)	1,312		−1.5%
U.S. Decennial Census

Perry Township is a township in Mercer County, Pennsylvania, United States. The population was 1,332 at the 2020 census, down from 1,453 in 2010.

== Geography ==
According to the United States Census Bureau, the township has a total area of 18.0 square miles (46.7 km^{2}), of which 18.0 square miles (46.7 km^{2}) is land and 0.06% is water.

== Demographics ==
As of the census of 2000, 1,471 people, 581 households, and 435 families reside in the township. The population density was 81.6 inhabitants per square mile (31.5/km^{2}). There were 627 housing units at an average density of 34.8 per square mile (13.4/km^{2}). The racial makeup of the township was 99.12% White, 0.07% African American, 0.07% Native American, 0.07% Asian, 0.07% from other races, and 0.61% from two or more races. Hispanic or Latino of any race were 0.14% of the population.

There were 581 households, of which 30.1% had children under 18 living with them, 66.3% were married couples living together, 5.7% had a female householder with no husband present, and 25.1% were non-families. 22.2% of all households were made up of individuals, and 10.0% had someone living alone who was 65 years of age or older. The average household size was 2.53 and the average family size was 2.96.

In the township the population was spread out, with 24.1% under 18, 5.8% from 18 to 24, 28.6% from 25 to 44, 26.2% from 45 to 64, and 15.2% who were 65 years of age or older. The median age was 40 years. For every 100 females there were 101.0 males. For every 100 females age 18 and over, there were 100.2 males.

The median income for a household in the township was $35,221, and the median income for a family was $40,192. Males had a median income of $30,843 versus $25,268 for females. The per capita income for the township was $16,482. About 5.0% of families and 7.9% of the population were below the poverty line, including 14.2% of those under age 18 and 3.8% of those age 65 or over.
