= 1800 =

1800 in various calendars
- Gregorian calendar: 1800; MDCCC
- French Republican calendar: 8–9; VIII–IX
- Ab urbe condita: 2553
- Armenian calendar: 1249; ԹՎ ՌՄԽԹ
- Assyrian calendar: 6550
- Balinese saka calendar: 1721–1722
- Bengali calendar: 1206–1207
- Berber calendar: 2750
- British Regnal year: 40 Geo. 3 – 41 Geo. 3
- Buddhist calendar: 2344
- Burmese calendar: 1162
- Byzantine calendar: 7308–7309
- Chinese calendar: 己未年 (Earth Goat); 4497 or 4290 — to — 庚申年 (Metal Monkey); 4498 or 4291
- Coptic calendar: 1516–1517
- Discordian calendar: 2966
- Ethiopian calendar: 1792–1793
- Hebrew calendar: 5560–5561
- Hindu calendars
- Vikram Samvat: 1856–1857
- Shaka Samvat: 1721–1722
- Kali Yuga: 4900–4901
- Holocene calendar: 11800
- Igbo calendar: 800–801
- Iranian calendar: 1178–1179
- Islamic calendar: 1214–1215
- Japanese calendar: Kansei 12 (寛政１２年)
- Javanese calendar: 1726–1727
- Julian calendar: Gregorian minus 11 or 12 days
- Korean calendar: 4133
- Minguo calendar: 112 before ROC 民前112年
- Nanakshahi calendar: 332
- Thai solar calendar: 2342–2343
- Tibetan calendar: ས་མོ་ལུག་ལོ་ (female Earth-Sheep); 1926 or 1545 or 773 — to — ལྕགས་ཕོ་སྤྲེ་ལོ་ (male Iron-Monkey); 1927 or 1546 or 774

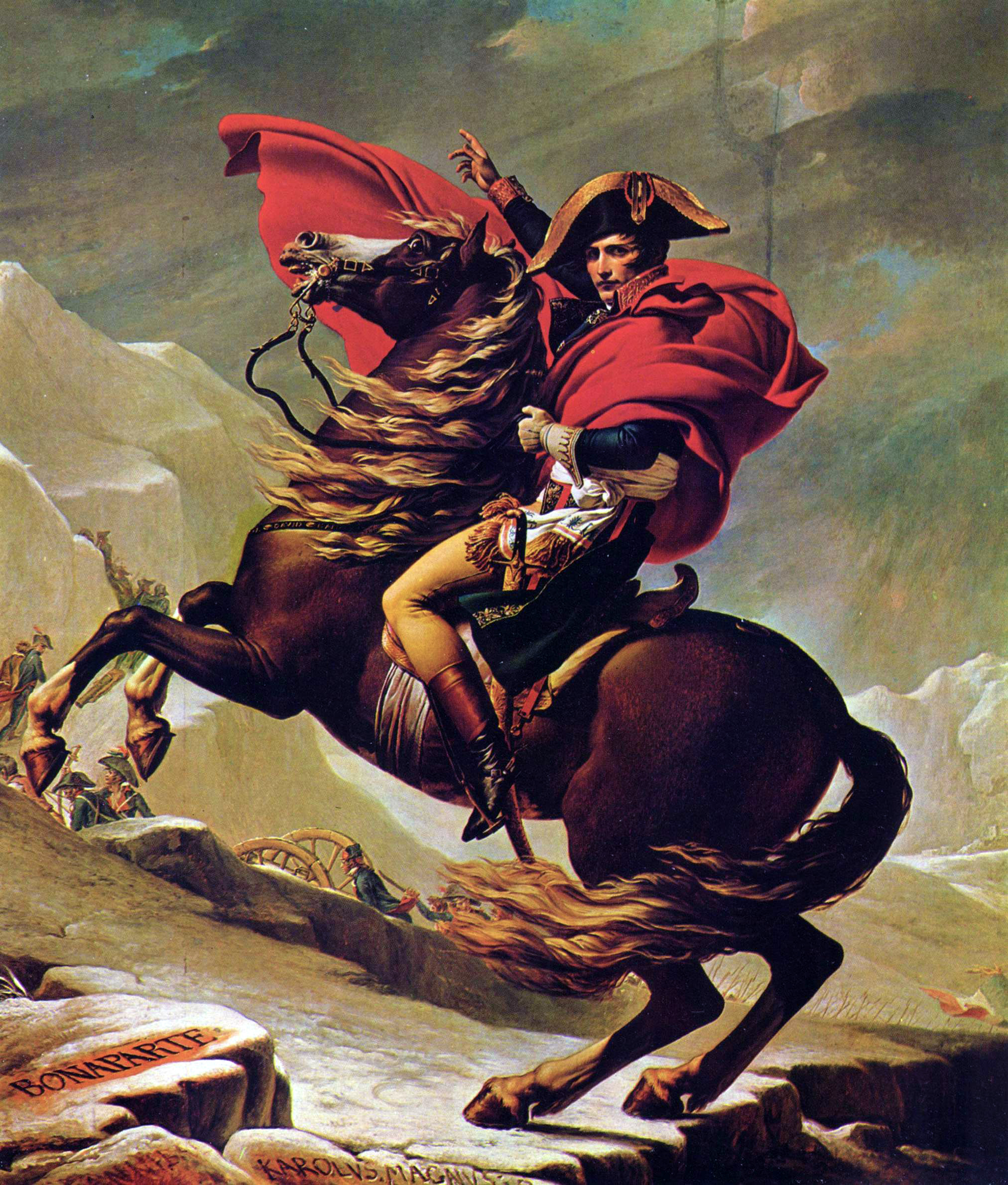
May 15: Napoleon begins crossing the Alps.

1800 (MDCCC) was a century common year starting on Wednesday of the Gregorian calendar and a leap year starting on Sunday of the Julian calendar, the 1800th year of the Common Era (CE) and Anno Domini (AD) designations, the 800th year of the 2nd millennium, the 100th and last year of the 18th century, and the 1st year of the 1800s decade. As of the start of 1800, the Gregorian calendar was 11 days ahead of the Julian calendar, which remained in localized use until 1923.

As of March 1 (O.S. February 18), when the Julian calendar acknowledged a leap day and the Gregorian calendar did not, the Julian calendar fell one day farther behind, bringing the difference to 12 days until February 28 (O.S. February 16), 1900.

== Events ==
=== January–March ===
- January 1
  - Quasi-War: Action of 1 January 1800 – A naval battle off the coast of Haiti, between four United States merchant vessels escorted by naval schooner USS Experiment, and a squadron of armed barges manned by Haitian pirates (known as picaroons), under the command of general André Rigaud, ends indecisively.
  - The Dutch East India Company dissolves.
- February 7 – A public plebiscite in France confirms Napoleon as First Consul, by a substantial majority.
- February 11 – Infrared radiation is discovered by astronomer Sir William Herschel.
- February 22 – The Baker rifle, designed by Ezekiel Baker, is selected by the British Board of Ordnance as a new standard.
- March 14 – Papal conclave, 1799–1800: cardinal Barnaba Chiaramonti succeeds Pius VI as Pius VII, the 251st pope. He is crowned on March 21, in Venice.
- March 17 – The British Royal Navy ship of the line, HMS Queen Charlotte (1790), catches fire off the coast of Capraia, with the loss of 673 lives.
- March 20 – Alessandro Volta describes his new invention, the voltaic pile, the first chemical battery, in a letter to the Royal Society of London.
- March 26 – British Royal Navy officer Henry Waterhouse first charts the Antipodes Islands.

=== April–June ===
- April 2
  - Ludwig van Beethoven's Symphony No. 1 premieres at the Burgtheater, in Vienna.
  - The Treaty of Constantinople establishes the Septinsular Republic, the first autonomous Greek state since the Fall of the Byzantine Empire.
- April 3 – The first voting, albeit indirect, begins in the 1800 United States presidential election as voters in the state of New York make their selections for the New York state legislature, which in turn will vote on October 31 for the state's 12 presidential electors. A majority of state legislature members are from the Democratic-Republican Party, rather than the Federalist Party. At the time, only 4 of the 16 U.S. states (Kentucky, Maryland, North Carolina and Virginia) have a popular vote for the presidential electors and the President. The other 12, including New York, have a popular vote for the state legislature, but not for the president. At the time, neither of the major parties have picked their nominees for president and vice president. The result will not be certified until February, 1801.
- April 6 – War of the Second Coalition: Siege of Genoa – General André Masséna is surrounded by 40,000 Austrian troops under Field Marshal Michael von Melas and blockaded by a strong British squadron under Lord Keith.
- April 24 – The U.S. Library of Congress is founded in Washington, D.C.
- May 14 – Second Coalition: French forces under General Louis-Alexandre Berthier are halted by 400 Austro-Piedmont soldiers, at Fort Bard in the Aosta Valley.
- May 15 – Napoleon and his French army (40,000 men)—not including the field artillery and baggage trains—(35,000 light artillery and infantry, 5,000 cavalry) begin crossing the Alps. He selects the shortest route through the Great St Bernard Pass, and invades after five days traversing the northern region of Italy.
- June 2 – The first smallpox vaccination is made in North America, at Trinity, Newfoundland.
- June 3 – U.S. President John Adams moves to Washington. Because the President's Mansion is still under construction, President Adams takes up residence at Tunnicliffe's City Hotel near the unfinished U.S. Capitol Building.
- June 4 – War of the Second Coalition: Siege of Genoa: The French army is evacuated from Genoa. Marshal André Masséna is allowed to march out, with all the honours of war. A portion of his force joins General Louis-Gabriel Suchet, and the rest is conveyed in British ships to Antibes.
- War of the Second Coalition: Battle of Montebello: French forces under General Jean Lannes defeat the Austrians at Montebello. Lannes distinguishes himself in battle; the Austrians lose 659 killed and 1,445 wounded. The French claim only 600 casualties, but a more realistic assessment is that they suffer about 3,000 losses.
- June 14
  - War of the Second Coalition: Battle of Marengo: Napoleon Bonaparte defeats the Austrian army (some 30,000 men) under General Michael von Melas near Marengo. The arrival of French reinforcements under General Louis Desaix reverses the battle. A late counterstroke turns a near-defeat into a political and strategic triumph. Desaix dies during the battle. Napoleon strengthens his position as First Consul and becomes the 'savior of France'. The Austrians lose 6,000 men killed or wounded and some 8,000 prisoners of war. The French lose over 5,000 men (25% total casualties).
  - French general Jean-Baptiste Kléber is assassinated in Cairo by Syrian Kurdish Muslim student Suleiman al-Halabi.
- June 15 – Convention of Alessandria (Armistice of Marengo): Austria agrees to evacuate much of Italy and suspends military operations.
- June 19 – War of the Second Coalition: Battle of Höchstädt – General Jean Victor Marie Moreau leads French forces to victory, opening the Danube passageway to Vienna.
- June 27 – War of the Second Coalition: Battle of Neuburg – General Claude Lecourbe leads French forces to victory, securing control of the Danube from Austria.

=== July–September ===
- July 2 – The Union with Ireland Act 1800 is passed by the Parliament of Great Britain; the Irish Parliament passes similar legislation in the following month, uniting the two kingdoms and abolishing the Parliament of Ireland.
- July 10 – Fort William College is established by Lord Wellesley, British Governor-General of India, in Calcutta, to promote Bengali, Hindi and other vernaculars of the Indian subcontinent.
- August 1 – King George III gives royal assent to the second Act of Union to unite the Kingdom of Great Britain and Kingdom of Ireland (both ruled by him) into the United Kingdom of Great Britain and Ireland, effective on January 1, 1801.
- August 30 – The plot by African-American blacksmith and slave Gabriel Prosser to seize Richmond, Virginia, and guide a slave uprising, is thwarted by a massive downpour on the evening that it is set to begin; two other slaves have revealed Prosser's plans to authorities, who have prepared to follow him to the rendezvous point and arrest the conspirators, so that "neither the geographical extent of the plot nor the number of insurgents in the conspiracy was revealed"; eventually, 25 slaves, including Prosser, will be captured, tried and hanged.
- September 4 – Siege of Malta (1798–1800): The French garrison in Valletta surrenders to British troops, who had been called at the invitation of the Maltese. The islands of Malta and Gozo become the Malta Protectorate.
- September 30 – The Convention of 1800, or Treaty of Mortefontaine, is signed between France and the United States of America, ending the Quasi-War.

=== October–December ===
- October 1 – Third Treaty of San Ildefonso: Spain returns Louisiana (New Spain) to France, in return for the Tuscany area of Italy.
- October 7 – French privateer Robert Surcouf leads the 150-man crew of his corvette Confiance to capture the 40-gun, 437-man British East Indiaman Kent in the Indian Ocean.
- November 1
  - U.S. President John Adams becomes the first President of the United States to live in the Executive Mansion (later renamed the White House).
  - Middlebury College is granted its charter by the Vermont General Assembly.
- November 17 – The United States Congress holds its first Washington, D.C., session.
- November 22 – War of the Second Coalition: Hostilities resume.

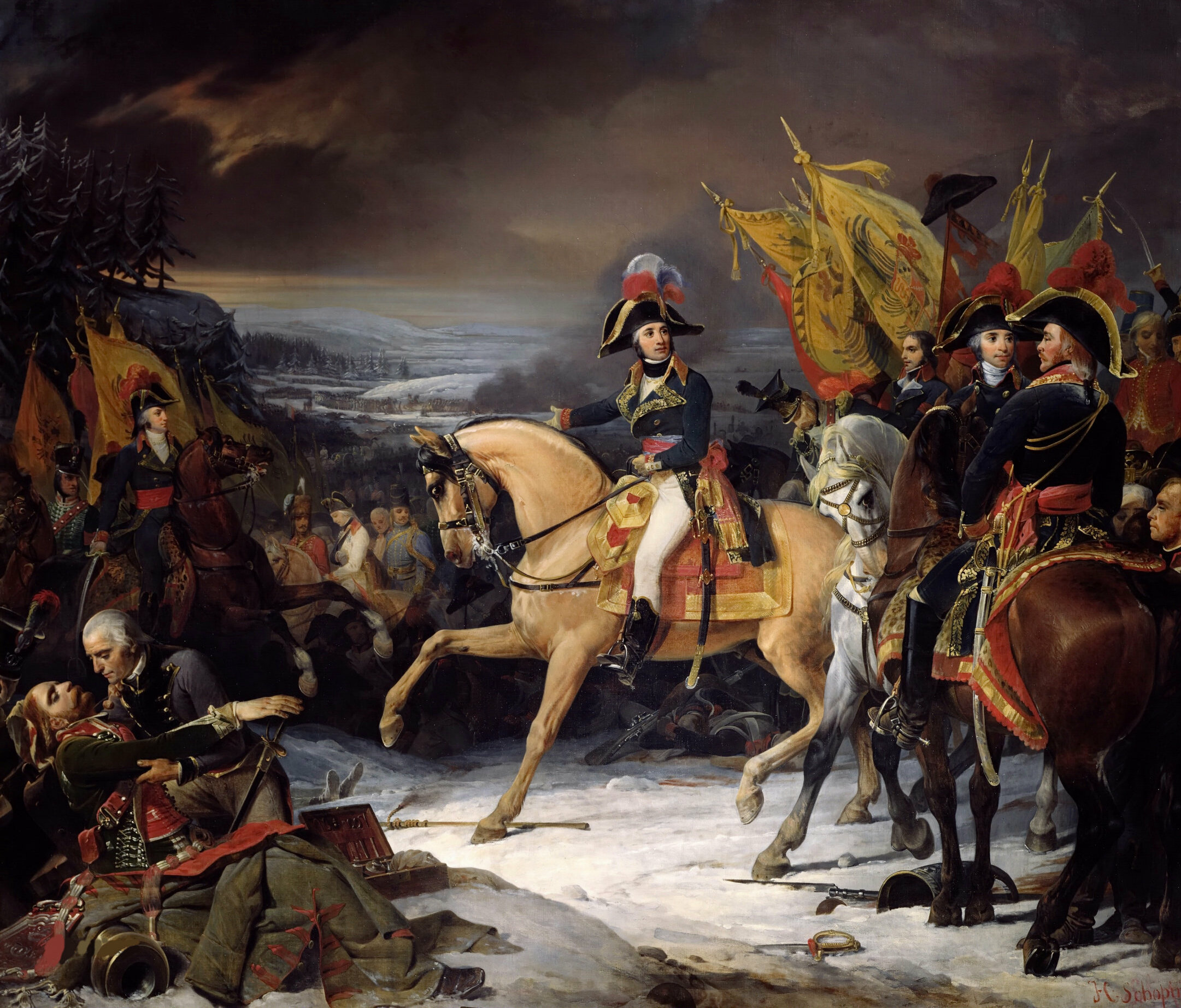
December 3: Battle of Hohenlinden.

- December 3
  - War of the Second Coalition: Battle of Hohenlinden – The French army defeats Habsburg and Bavarian troops.
  - The 1800 United States presidential election: The Electoral College casts votes for president and Vice President that result in a tie between Thomas Jefferson and Aaron Burr, requiring a contingent election which will select Jefferson as president.
- December 24
  - The Plot of the rue Saint-Nicaise fails to kill Napoleon Bonaparte.
  - Pierre Coudrin and Henriette Aymer de la Chevalerie found the Congregation of the Sacred Hearts of Jesus and Mary in Paris.
- December 25 – The Armistice of Steyr is signed between French and Imperial forces in Germany, ending active hostilities of the War of the Second Coalition in Germany.

== Births ==
=== January–June ===
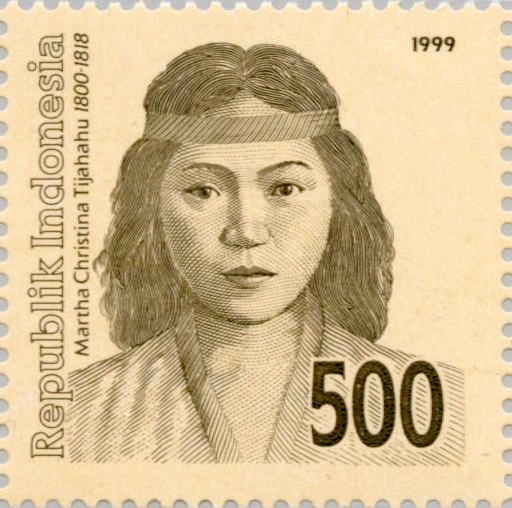
Martha Christina Tiahahu

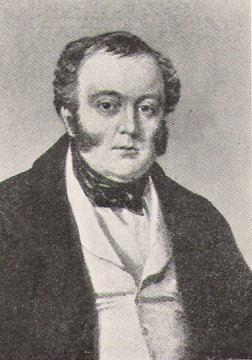
George Hudson

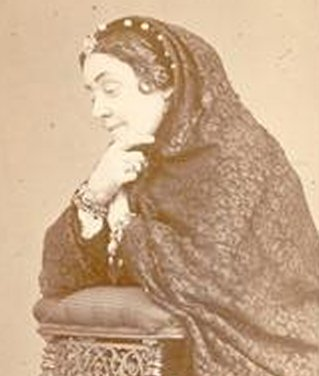
Anna Maria Hall

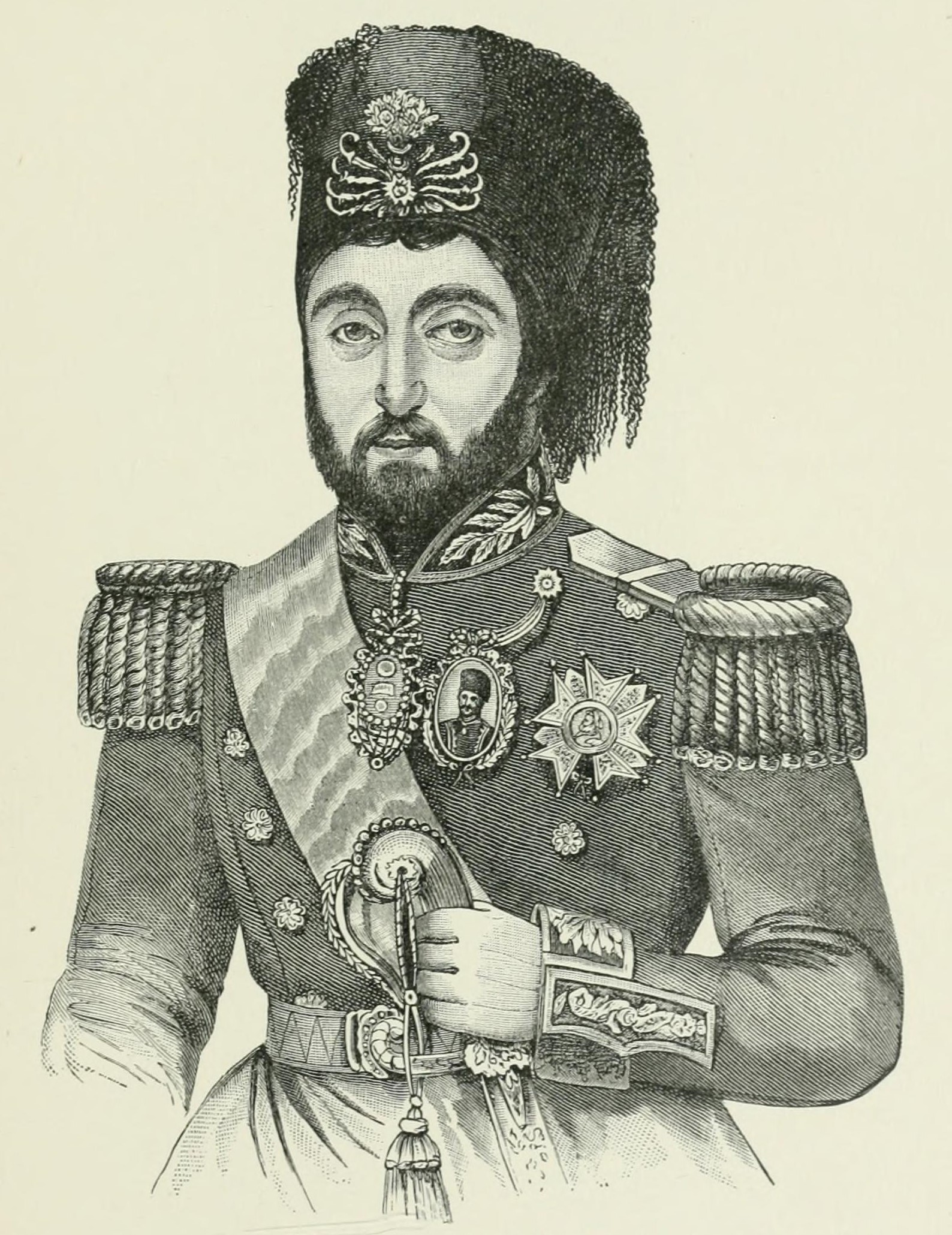
Mustafa Reşid Pasha

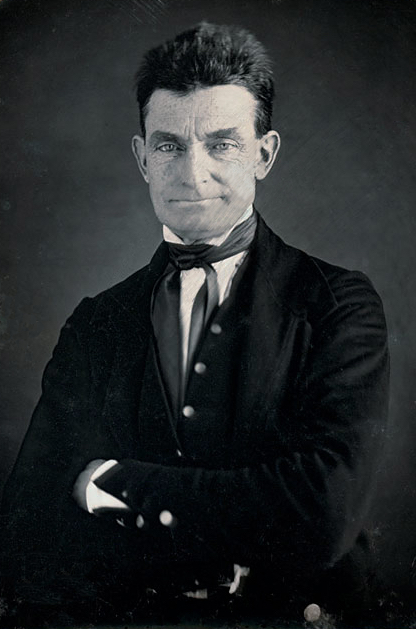
John Brown

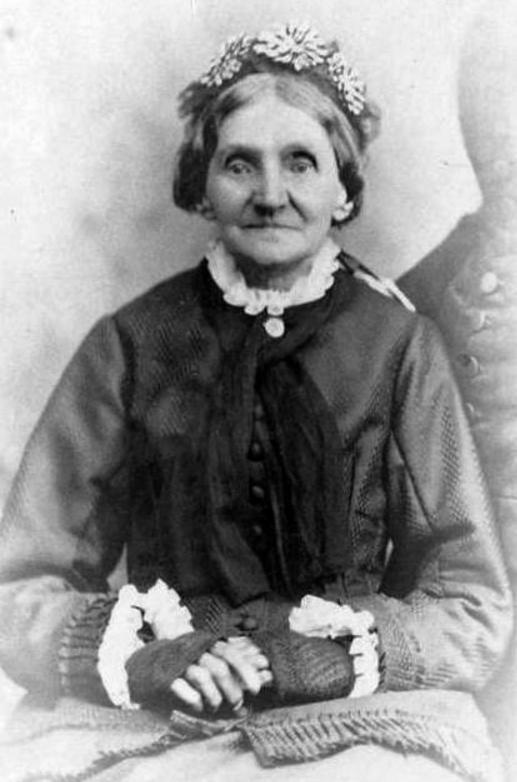
Elizabeth Ann Whitney

- January 1 – Francis Egerton, 1st Earl of Ellesmere, English landowner (d. 1857)
- January 4 – Martha Christina Tiahahu, Moluccan freedom fighter, national heroine of Indonesia (d. 1818)
- January 6 – Anna Maria Hall, Irish writer (d. 1881)
- January 7 – Millard Fillmore, 13th President of the United States (d. 1874)
- January 11 – Ányos Jedlik, Hungarian physicist, inventor of the dynamo (d. 1895)
- January 12 – George Villiers, 4th Earl of Clarendon, English diplomat, statesman (d. 1870)
- January 14 – Ludwig von Köchel, Austrian musicologist (d. 1877)
- January 17 – Caleb Cushing, American statesman, diplomat (d. 1879)
- January 24 – Edwin Chadwick, English social reformer (d. 1890)
- Johann Gerhard Oncken, German Baptist preacher (d. 1884)
- Elizabeth Ann Whitney, American Mormon leader (d. 1882)
- January 27 – Evelyn Denison, 1st Viscount Ossington, English statesman (d. 1875)
- February 1 – Brian Houghton Hodgson, English civil servant (d. 1894)
- February 6 – Achille Devéria, French painter, lithographer (d. 1857)
- February 9 – Hyrum Smith, American religious leader (d. 1844)
- Joseph von Führich, Austrian painter (d. 1876)
- March 2 – Yevgeny Baratynsky, Russian poet (d. 1844)
- March 3 – Heinrich Georg Bronn, German geologist, paleontologist (d. 1862)
- March 4 – William Price, Welsh physician, eccentric (d. 1893)
- March 10
  - Victor Aimé Huber, German social reformer (d. 1869)
  - George Hudson, English railway financier (d. 1871)
- March 13 – Mustafa Reşid Pasha, Turkish statesman, diplomat (d. 1858)
- March 16 – Emperor Ninkō of Japan (d. 1846)
- March 17 – Rudolf Ewald Stier, German Protestant churchman, mystic (d. 1862)
- March 20
  - Braulio Carrillo Colina, Costa Rican head of state, politician (d. 1845)
  - Gottfried Bernhardy, German philologist, literary historian (d. 1875)
- March 25 – Ernst Heinrich Karl von Dechen, German geologist, mineralogist (d. 1889)
- March 28 – Johann Georg Wagler, German herpetologist (d. 1832)
- April 2 – Andrzej Artur Zamoyski, Polish nobleman (d. 1874)
- April 4 – Tokugawa Nariaki, Japanese daimyō of Mito (d. 1860)
- April 10 – Henri-Gustave Delvigne, French soldier, weapon inventor (d. 1876)
- April 15 – James Clark Ross, British naval officer, explorer (d. 1862)
- April 16
  - Jakob Heine, German orthopaedist (d. 1879)
  - George Bingham, 3rd Earl of Lucan, British soldier (d. 1888)
- April 19 – Robert Goodenow, American politician and former member of the United States House of Representatives (d. 1874).
- May 1 – James Black, American bladesmith, creator of the original Bowie knife (d. 1870)
- May 4 – John McLeod Campbell, Scottish churchman (d. 1872)
- May 5 – Louis Christophe François Hachette, French publisher (d. 1864)
- May 6 – Roman Sanguszko, Polish noble (d. 1881)
- May 9 – John Brown, American abolitionist (d. 1859)
- May 23 – Rómulo Díaz de la Vega, 23rd President of Mexico (d. 1877)
- May 30 – Karl Wilhelm Feuerbach, German geometer (d. 1834)
- June 1 – Charles Fremantle, British Royal Navy officer (d. 1869)
- June 2 – Nicholas P. Trist, secretary to President Andrew Jackson of the U.S. (d. 1874)
- June 3 – Gustaw Potworowski, Polish activist (d. 1860)
- June 12 – Samuel Wright Mardis, American politician (d. 1836)
- June 17 – William Parsons, 3rd Earl of Rosse, Irish astronomer (d. 1867)
- June 23 – Karol Marcinkowski, Polish physician, social activist (d. 1846)
- June 29 – William Boxall, 2nd director of the National Gallery in London (d. 1879)
- June 30 – Richard Bethell, 1st Baron Westbury, Lord Chancellor of Great Britain (d. 1873)

=== July–December ===
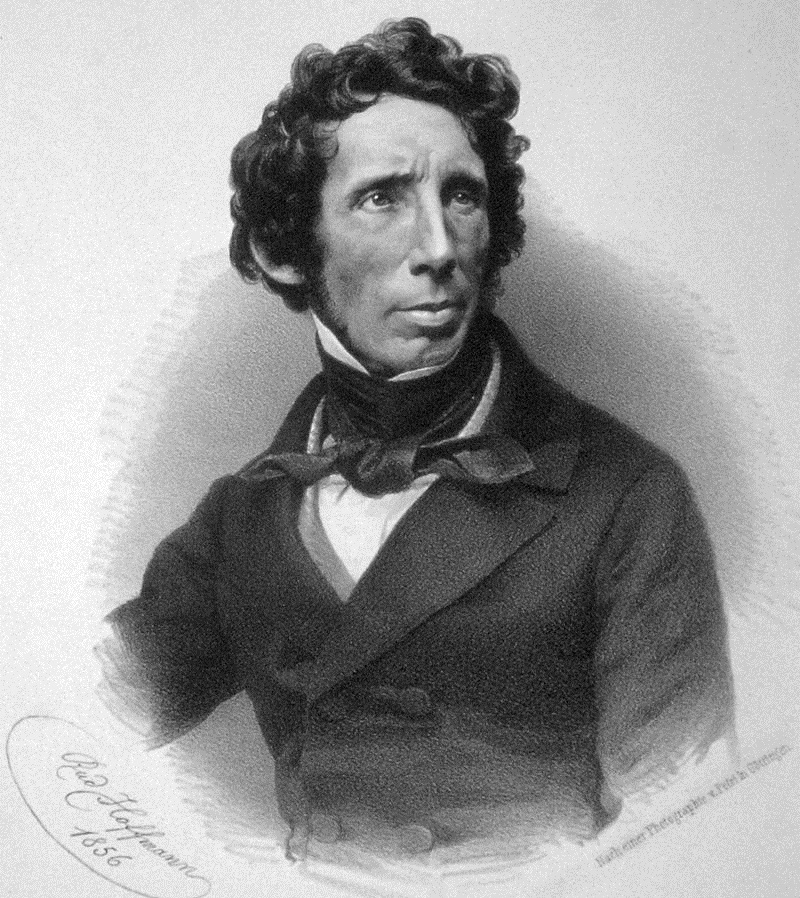
Friedrich Wöhler

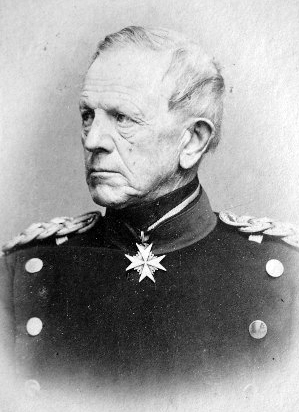
Helmuth von Moltke the Elder

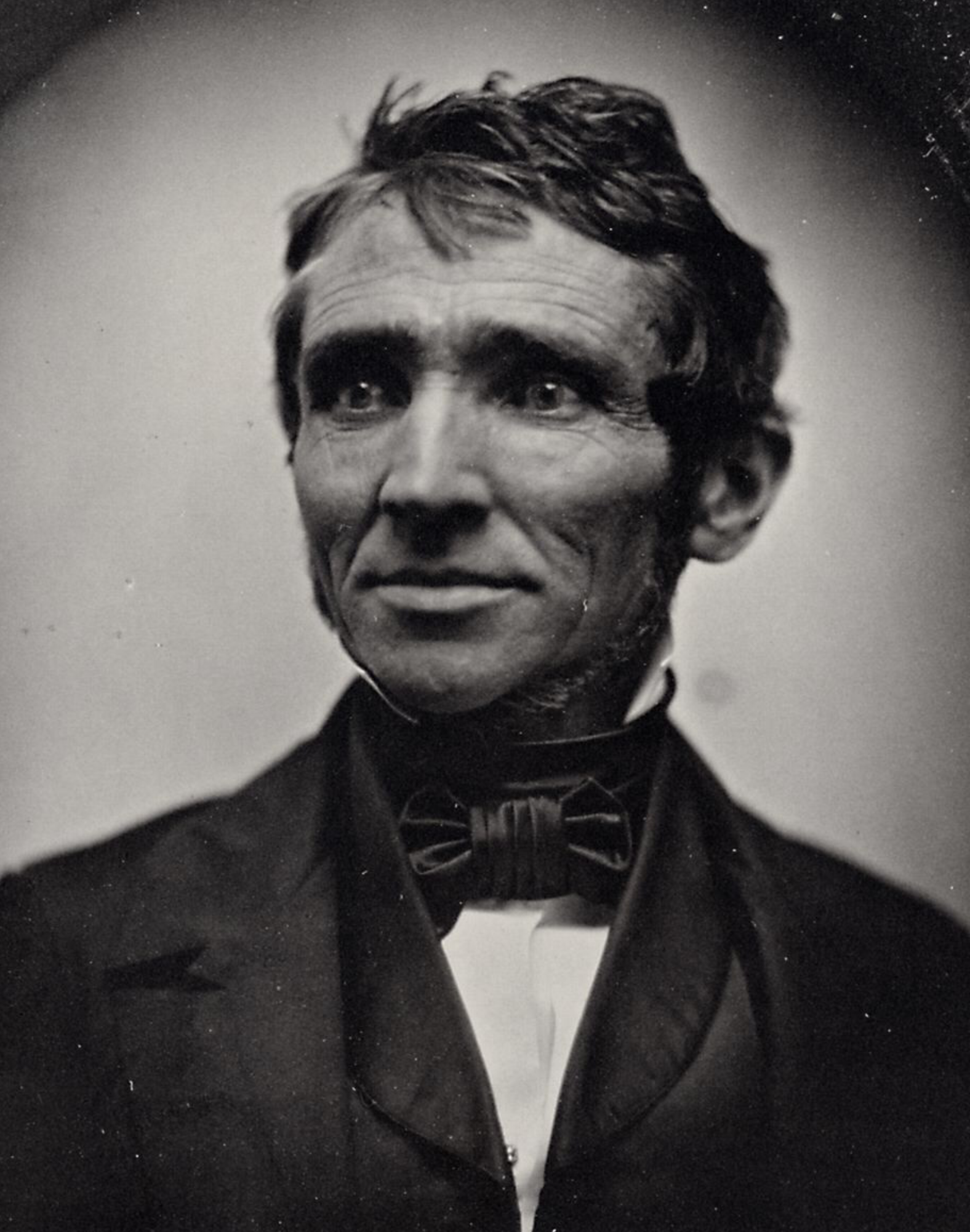
Charles Goodyear

- July 15 – Sidney Breese, American senator from Illinois, father of the Illinois Central Railroad (d. 1878)
- July 19 – Juan José Flores, 2-time President of Ecuador (d. 1864)
- July 21 – Constance Trotti, Belgian salonniére, culture patron (d. 1871)
- July 24 – Henry Shaw, American botanist (d. 1889)
- July 29 – George Bradshaw, English timetable publisher (d. 1853)
- July 31 – Friedrich Wöhler, German chemist (d. 1882)
- August 12 – Jean-Jacques Ampère, French philologist, writer and historian (d. 1864)
- August 17 – Charles Rogier, twice Prime Minister of Belgium (d. 1885)
- August 20 – Bernhard Heine, German physician, bone specialist and inventor (d. 1846)
- August 22
  - Edward Bouverie Pusey, English churchman (d. 1882)
  - Frank Stone, English painter (d. 1859)
- September 1 – Giuseppe Gabriel Balsamo-Crivelli, Italian naturalist (d. 1874)
- September 22 – George Bentham, English botanist (d. 1884)
- October 14 – John Hogan, Irish sculptor (d. 1858)
- October 19 – Salome Sellers, American centenarian, last surviving person from the 18th century (d. 1909)
- October 23 – Henri Milne-Edwards, French zoologist (d. 1885)
- October 26 – Helmuth von Moltke the Elder, German field marshal (d. 1891)
- November 21 – Barney Aaron, English bare-knuckle boxer (d. 1850)
- November 22 – Linn Boyd, 20th Speaker of the U.S. House of Representatives (d. 1859)
- December 3 – France Prešeren, Slovenian romantic poet (d. 1849)
- December 25 – John Phillips, English geologist (d. 1874)
- December 29 – Charles Goodyear, American inventor of the vulcanization process (d. 1860)

== Deaths ==
=== January–June ===
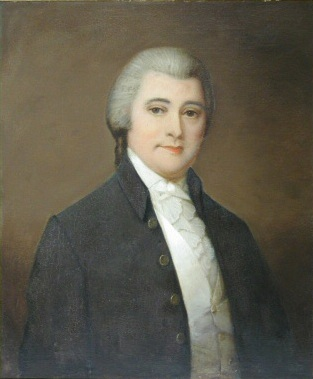
William Blount

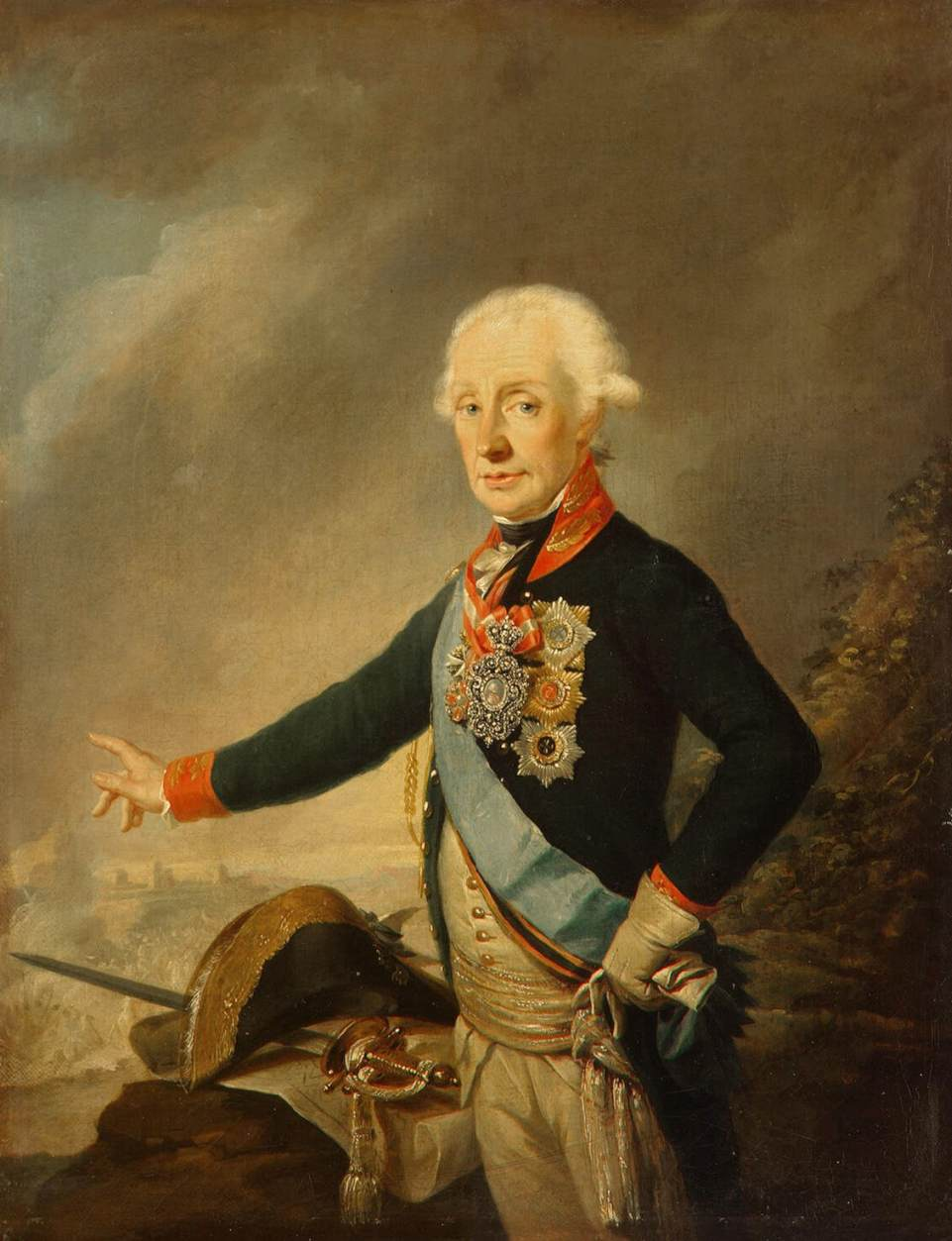
Alexander Suvorov

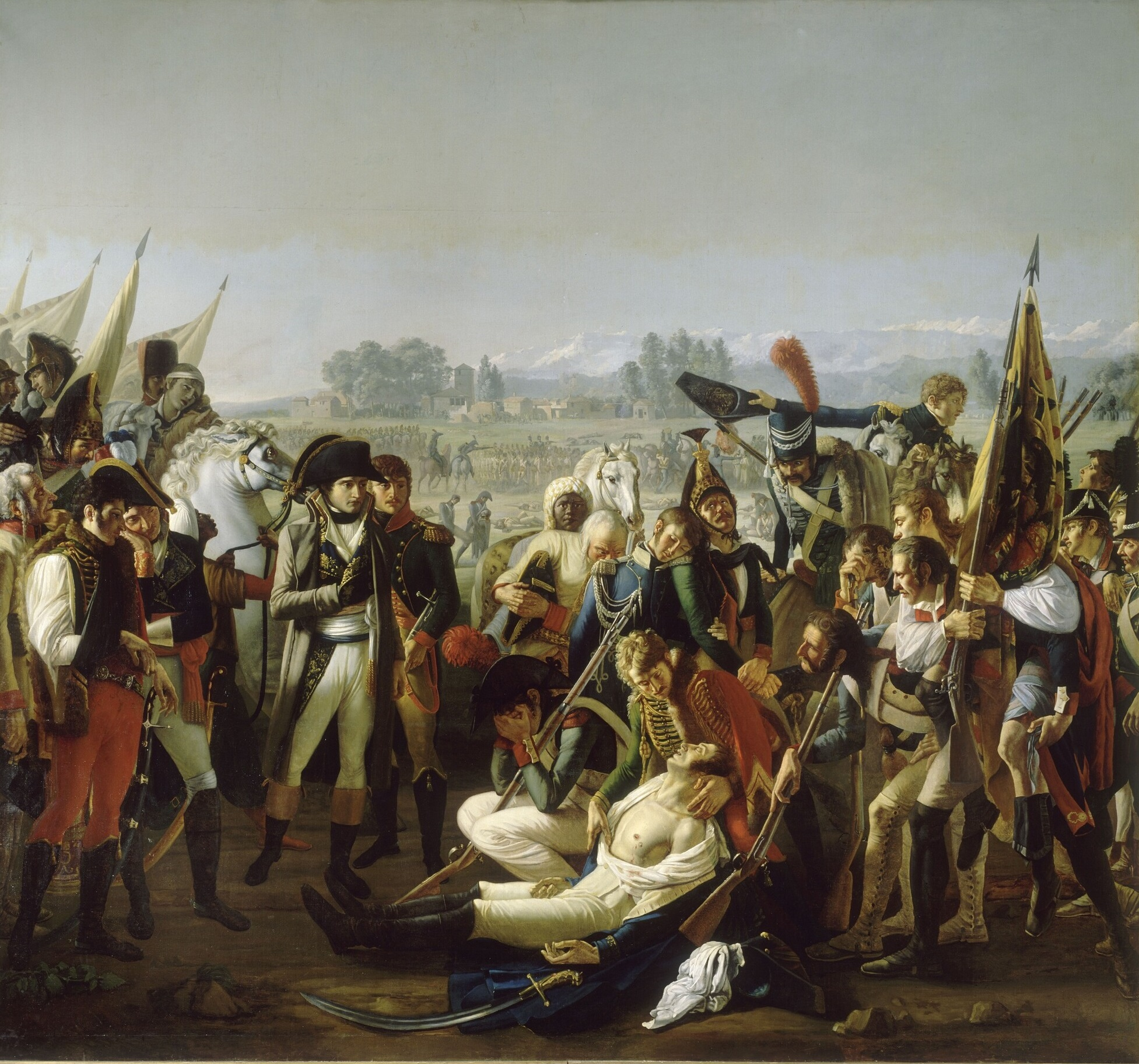
The Death of General Desaix by Jean Broc

- January 1 – Louis-Jean-Marie Daubenton, French naturalist (b. 1716)
- January 3 – Count Karl-Wilhelm Finck von Finckenstein, Prime Minister of Prussia (b. 1714)
- January 6
- William Jones, English divine (b. 1726)
- Friedrich Adolf Riedesel, German soldier (b. 1738)
- January 9 – Jean Étienne Championnet, French general (b.1762)
- January 11 – Kyra Frosini, Greek heroine (b. 1773)
- January 16 – Johann Christian Wiegleb, German chemist (b. 1732)
- January 20 – Thomas Mifflin, first Governor of Pennsylvania (b. 1744)
- January 23 – Edward Rutledge, U.S. statesman (b. 1749)
- February 4 – Charlotte Sophie of Aldenburg, German sovereign (b. 1715)
- February 7 – Anna Jabłonowska, Polish magnate and politician (b. 1728)
- February 27 – Adélaïde of France, French princess (b.1732)
- March 1 – John Hazelwood, English-born officer in the U.S. Continental Navy (b. 1726)
- March 13 – Nana Fadnavis, Maratha statesman (b. 1742)
- March 14 – Daines Barrington, English naturalist (b. 1727)
- March 19 – Joseph de Guignes, French orientalist (b. 1721)
- March 21 – William Blount, U.S. statesman (b. 1749)
- March 29 – Marc René, marquis de Montalembert, French military engineer and writer (b. 1714)
- April 13 – Kazimierz Poniatowski, Polish nobleman (b. 1721)
- April 21 – Johan August Meijerfeldt the Younger, Swedish field marshal (b. 1725)
- April 22 – George Paulet, 12th Marquess of Winchester, British politician (b. 1722)
- April 25
- Israel Acrelius, Swedish missionary and clergyman (b. 1714)
- Ezekiel Cornell, Continental Congressman from Rhode Island (b. 1732)
- William Cowper, English poet (b. 1731)
- May 7 – Niccolò Piccinni, Italian composer (b. 1728)
- May 23 – Henry Cort, English ironmaster (b. 1740)
- May 18 – Alexander Suvorov, Count of Rymnik (b. 1729)
- May 29 – Charlotte Slottsberg, Swedish ballerina (b. 1760)
- June 2 – Ingeborg Akeleye, Norwegian noble known for her love life (b. 1741)
- June 14
- Louis Charles Antoine Desaix, French military leader (killed in battle) (b. 1768)
- Jean-Baptiste Kléber, French general (assassinated) (b. 1753)
- June 18 – Francis V de Beauharnais, French nobleman, soldier, politician, colonial governor and admiral (b. 1714)
- June 20 – Abraham Gotthelf Kästner, German mathematician (b. 1719)
- June 24 – Charles Stewart, American revolutionary (b. 1729)
- June 28
- Heinrich XI, Prince Reuss of Greiz, German noble (b. 1722)
- King Jeongjo of Joseon, 22nd ruler of the Joseon dynasty of Korea (b. 1752)
- Théophile Corret de la Tour d'Auvergne, grenadier officer in the French army (b. 1743)
- June 30 – Thomas Townshend, 1st Viscount Sydney, British politician (b. 1732)

=== July–December ===
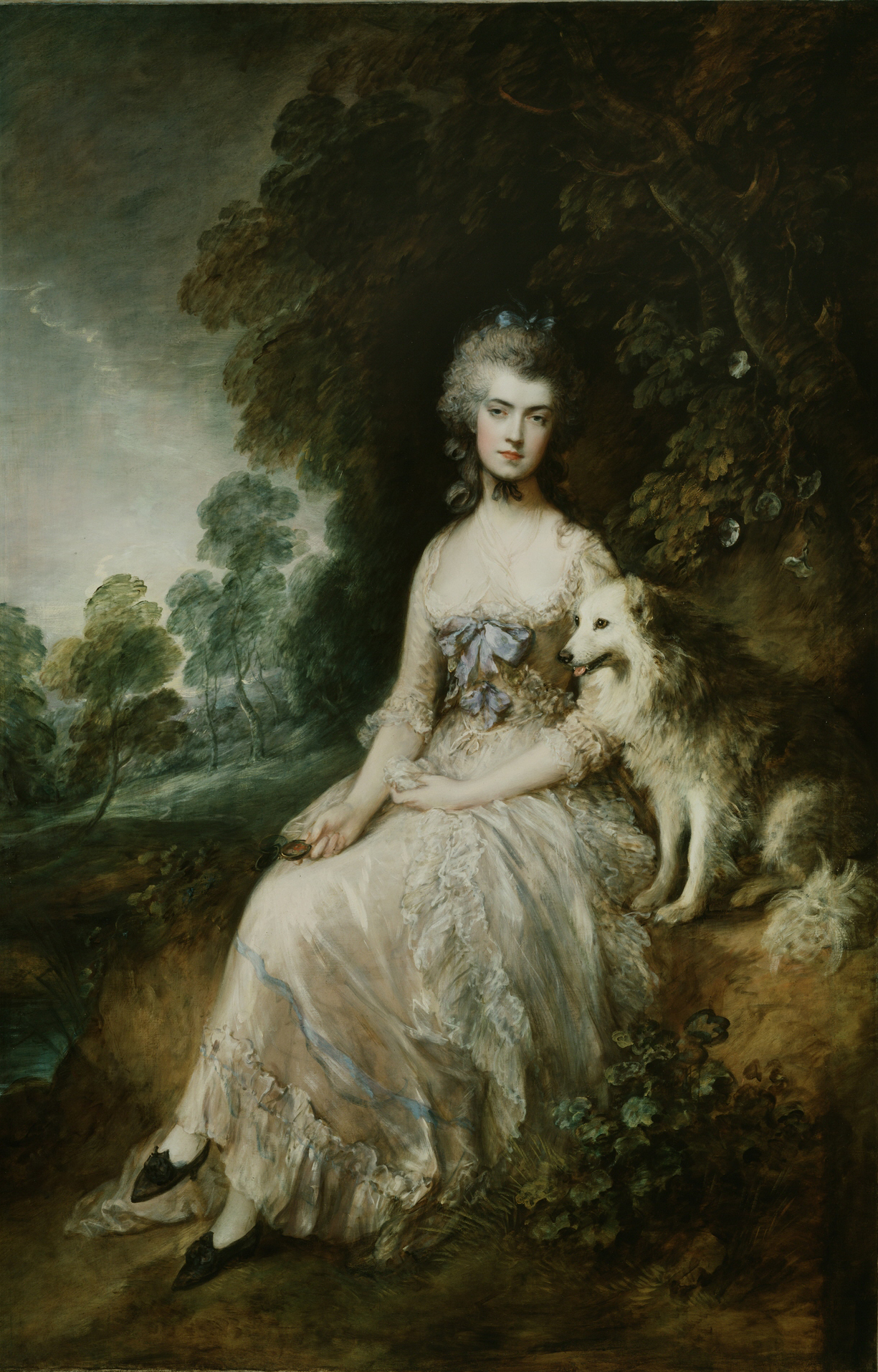
Mary Robinson

- July 14 – Lorenzo Mascheroni, Italian mathematician (b. 1750)
- July 18 – John Rutledge, governor of South Carolina (b. 1739)
- August 12 – Anne-Catherine de Ligniville, Madame Helvétius, French salon holder (b. 1722)
- August 16 – Samuel Barrington, English admiral (b. 1729)
- August 25 – Elizabeth Montagu, English literary critic (b. 1718)
- August 31 – John Blair, American politician (b. 1732)
- September 2 – Maciej Radziwiłł, Polish nobleman (b. 1749)
- September 3 – Elżbieta Branicka, Polish szlachta and politician (b. 1734)
- September 10 – Johann David Schoepff, German naturalist, doctor (b. 1752)
- September 23 – Dominique de La Rochefoucauld, French Catholic cardinal (b. 1712)
- September 26 – William Billings, American choral composer (b. 1746)
- September 27 – William Gibbons, American lawyer, revolutionary (b. 1726)
- October 4 – Johann Hermann, German physician, naturalist (b. 1738)
- October 10 – Gabriel Prosser, American slave revolutionary (b. approx. 1776)
- October 16 – Benjamin Huntington, American lawyer, politician (b. 1736)
- October 28 – Artemas Ward, American Major General in the American Revolutionary War, Congressman from Massachusetts (b. 1727)
- October 29 – Koide Ichijūrō, kabuki composer and performer (b. date unknown)
- November 5 – Jesse Ramsden, English astronomical instrument maker (b. 1735)
- November 14 – François Claude Amour, marquis de Bouillé, French general (b. 1739)
- November 25 – Francisco Bouligny, former military governor of Spanish Louisiana (b. 1736)
- November 30 – Matthew Robinson, 2nd Baron Rokeby, English eccentric nobleman (b. 1712)
- December – Jean-Baptiste Audebert, French artist, naturalist (b. 1759)
- December 7 – Wilhelm von Knyphausen, Hessian Lieutenant-General (b. 1716)
- December 27 – Hugh Blair, Scottish Presbyterian preacher, man of letters (b. 1718)
- December 30 – Thomas Dimsdale, English physician, banker (b. 1712)

=== Date unknown ===
- Marie-Louise-Adélaïde Boizot, French engraver (b. 1744)
