= Siege of Jacmel =

Siege during the War of the South in Haiti (1799–1800)

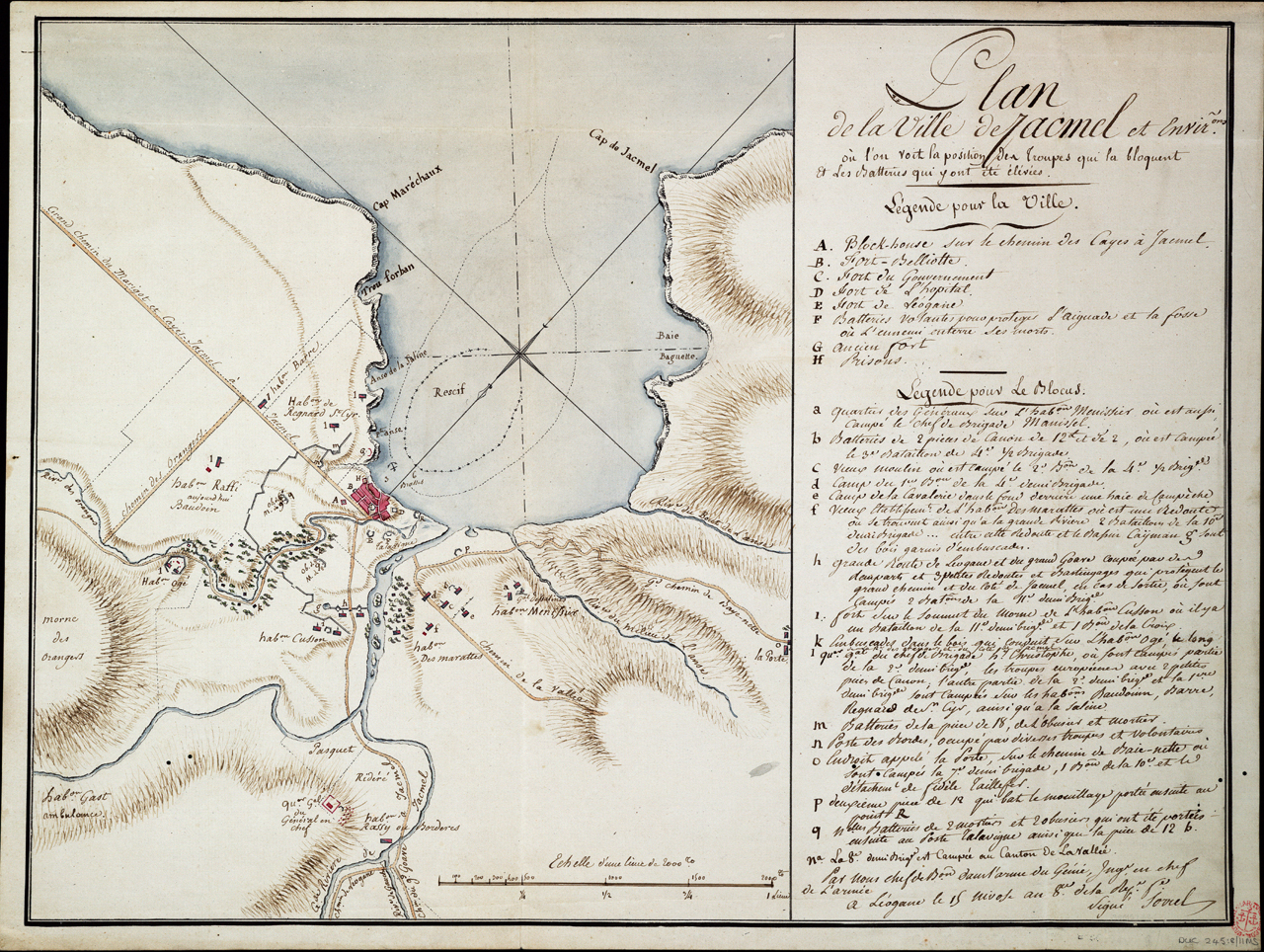
“Map of the city and surroundings of Jacmel used to indicate the lines and positions occupied during the time of the blockade, as well as the batteries established to beat the defences of the sieges“ created by the Planter Antoine-François Sorrel des Revières

The Siege of Jacmel (Mid-November 1799–11 March 1800) was a four-and-half month long siege that took place during the War of the South, a sub-war of the Haitian revolution.

== Background ==
The War of the South was an internal civil war in Haiti, between black forces led by Toussaint L’Overture and the mulatto leader André Rigaud, they both vied for power over the de facto French colony following the British departure. The conflict mainly occurred in the southern regions of Haiti. L’Overture suppressed the northern revolts and consolidated his rule in the north by October. In November, General Christophe reached Jacmel with his contingent of the army.

== Siege ==
Toussaint L’Overture's generals Jean-Jacques Dessalines and Henri Christophe brought their ten thousand troops south to besiege the small port city of Jacmel, occupied by Rigaud's forces. Rigaud's forces were in a better position as they weren't running out of supplies, whilst L’Overture's army was starved and tired. However, with American intervention this flipped, and soon Jacmel's forces began to be starved. Dessalines launched a failed attack on 5 and 6 of January. The American frigate General Greene led by Captain Christopher Perry aided L’Overture's forces by providing artillery support against Jacmel. The ship opened fire for around 30 to 40 minutes causing Rigaud's forces to retreat to their last stronghold. L’Overture's forces advanced and made a final attack against Alexandre Pétion's break out army, finishing the siege on the night of 11 March 1800 and the early hours of the 12 March. The battle marked the start of American interventionism in the Caribbean. Rigaud fled in July but was soon captured by another American vessel.
