= Action of 1 January 1800 =

Naval battle of the Quasi War

- Part of Quasi-War; War of Knives
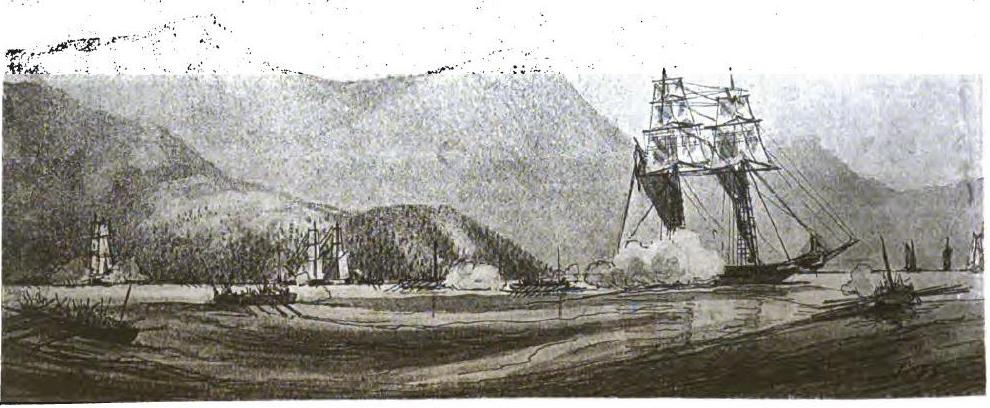
- A sketch of the action between Experiment and picaroons (1875)
Date	1 January 1800
Location	Gulf of Gonâve, Saint-Domingue 19°N 73.5°W
Result	American victory

Belligerents
United States	France

Commanders and leaders
William Maley; David Porter	(French First Republic) André Rigaud

Strength
1 armed schooner 4 merchant ships	14 armed barges 400–500 Haitian Picaroons

Casualties and losses
2 merchant ships captured 1 killed 1 wounded	3 barges sunk Many killed
- Civilian casualties: 1 wounded

The action of 1 January 1800 was a naval battle of the Quasi-War that took place off the coast of present-day Haiti, near the island of Gonâve in the Bight of Léogâne. The battle was fought between an American convoy of four merchant vessels escorted by the United States naval schooner USS Experiment, and a squadron of armed barges manned by Haitians known as picaroons.

A French-aligned Haitian general, André Rigaud, had instructed his forces to attack all foreign shipping within their range of operations. Accordingly, once Experiment and her convoy of merchant ships neared Gonâve, the picaroons attacked them, capturing two of the American merchant ships before withdrawing. Experiment managed to save the other two ships in her convoy, and escorted them to a friendly port. On the American side, only the captain of the schooner Mary was killed. Though the picaroons took heavy losses during this engagement, they remained strong enough to continue wreaking havoc among American shipping in the region. Only after Rigaud was forced out of power by the forces of Toussaint L'Ouverture, leader of the 1791 Haitian Revolution, did the picaroon attacks cease.

== Background ==
With the dawn of the Haitian Revolution in 1791, a successful slave rebellion on the French colony, then known as Saint-Domingue, allowed the local population to gain control over the government. Despite their success in removing the French colonial authorities, the various political factions that had seized control of the colony were fractious, and fighting soon broke out among them. By 1800, the War of Knives between the pro-French André Rigaud and the pro-autonomy Toussaint L'Ouverture was in full swing and Saint-Domingue was divided in two. Rigaud controlled part of the southern portion of Saint-Domingue while L'Ouverture controlled the rest of the French colony. In need of supplies and materiel, Rigaud's forces attacked any non-French ship that passed them.

Concurrently with the War of Knives, the United States and France were engaged in a bout of limited naval warfare in the Caribbean as part of the Quasi-War. In late December 1799 the American armed schooner Experiment was escorting under convoy the brig Daniel and Mary (3 guns) and the schooners Sea Flower (3 guns), Mary, and Washington to prevent their capture by French privateers. On 1 January 1800, the convoy was caught in a dead calm off the north side of the present-day Haitian island of Gonâve, in the Bight of Leogane. Seeing the convoy becalmed, Rigaud sent eleven armed barges out to attack and seize the American vessels.

The crews of two of the American merchant vessels possessed only small arms, but their escort, Experiment, was a much more powerful vessel. Commanded by William Maley, the 135-ton Experiment was armed with 12 six-pounder guns and had a complement of 70 men. In comparison, Rigaud's initial attack force consisted of eleven barges, flying the French flag, crewed by 40 to 50 men each in the smaller ones, and 60 or 70 in the larger vessels. These barges were primarily propelled by oars, with 26 per vessel. The Haitian craft were each equipped with a mix of swivel guns and four-pounder cannon, with most vessels armed with two or three guns as well as small arms. In addition to the vessels that set out to attack the convoy, there were more barges and men nearby that the Haitians could call upon if reinforcements were needed. In total some 37 barges and 1500 men were at Rigaud's immediate disposal, though the Americans did not know this during the attack. Individually the Haitian barges presented only a small threat to the convoy, but when attacking en masse they could easily overwhelm and capture the American ships if they managed to board them.

== Battle ==
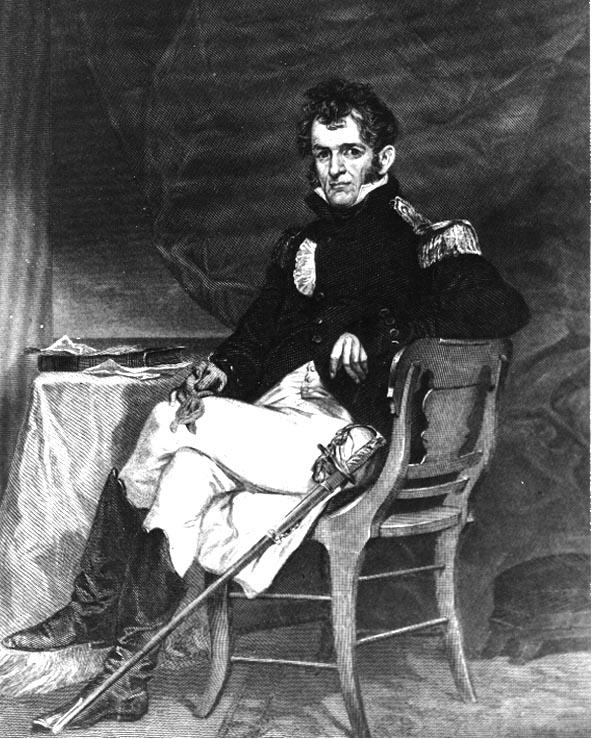
Commodore David Porter

Experiment kept her gunports closed and passed herself off as a merchantman, while the Haitians sailed closer to the convoy with the intent of boarding and capturing all five vessels. Once the Haitians were in musket range of the American vessels they opened fire on them, and Experiment returned the fire. Grapeshot from the Americans wreaked havoc among the Haitian barges and they were forced to withdraw. They stood off the American convoy for thirty minutes before beaching at the nearby island of Gonâve to land their wounded and gather reinforcements. With three more barges and fresh crews, the picaroons set off to assault the American convoy once more. They divided themselves into three squadrons of four barges each and set course to attack Experiment. The lead and centermost divisions attacked the sides of the American warship while the rear division assaulted the stern. During the lull in fighting Experiment had readied herself for the picaroons' next assault by positioning musketeers in defensive positions, loading her main guns, and raising boarding nets. Thus, when the Haitians attacked the American warship again she was well prepared to repulse any attempt at boarding her.

For three hours, Experiment battled the barges, sinking two and killing a great many of the picaroons. During this time two of the barges left the warship and attacked the merchant ships. These barges managed to protect themselves from Experiment by sailing behind the schooner Mary, which was between the two barges and the warship. The Haitians boarded Mary and killed her captain. Many of the crew jumped into the sea, and the rest hid in the hold. The second barge attempted to take Daniel and Mary but was sunk by fire from Experiment. Once the Haitians had boarded Mary, Experiment opened fire upon her with grapeshot, driving the picaroons off.

The entire flotilla of Haitians once more retired to Gonâve and replaced their wounded crewmembers with fresh ones. Seeing that Daniel and Mary and Washington had drifted away from the convoy, the Haitians set out to attack them. The two civilian vessels, having drifted too far from the protection of Experiment's guns, were abandoned by their crews and passengers who fled to the American warship. The Haitians boarded and plundered these two vessels, carrying them further away from Experiment. Experiment managed to get close enough to the barges to attack them with her cannon but could not pursue them, as two barges had broken away from the main flotilla and were positioned to take Mary and Sea Flower if Experiment left them. Eventually the remnants of the convoy managed to make it to Léogâne, where they were looked after by the American consul.

== Aftermath ==
USS Experiment had succeeded in protecting two of the convoy, but the other two ships were taken by the picaroons. On the American side, only the captain of the schooner Mary had been killed. The Americans also suffered two wounded: one civilian, and Experiment's second in command David Porter, who had been shot in the arm during the action. In exchange the Haitians had lost two of their barges and a great many casualties. Rigaud's picaroons attacked another American convoy later in the year and continued to harass American shipping until Rigaud was ousted from Saint-Domingue at the end of the War of Knives. After fleeing to Guadeloupe, he left for France on the schooner Diane, but was captured and taken to Saint Kitts when Experiment intercepted her on 1 October 1800.

The action would prove controversial in the United States as several officers' reports suggested that Lieutenant Maley, commander of Experiment, had shown cowardice during the engagement. Lieutenant Porter stated that Maley had tried to insist on surrendering to the picaroons immediately upon their arrival. It was alleged that Maley thought the situation was hopeless due to the sheer number of pro-French Haitians who were attacking the convoy, and he had attempted to strike the colors.

The officers' reports also commended Porter, stating that he had saved Experiment and her convoy by acting on his own initiative to ignore Maley's defeatism, urging the crew to fight. Other American officials, such as the American consul at Leonge who was aboard the Experiment during the action, disagreed with Porter's accusations and instead lauded Maley for his bravery. Threats of court-martial were made against Maley, but no formal charges regarding the incident were ever brought. On 16 July 1800 he was replaced as commander of Experiment by Charles Stewart. The incident haunted his career until his retirement.
