= French ship Conquérant =

A number of ships of the French Navy have borne the name Conquérant (Conqueror). Amongst them:

- Conquérant (1666), a 66-gun ship of the line built in Holland for France
- Conquérant (1688), a 76-gun ship of the line built in 1688 and rebuilt in 1712
- Conquérant (1746), a 74-gun ship of the line
- Conquérant (1765), a Citoyen-class 74-gun ship of the line (rebuilt from 1746 ship)
- Conquérant (1801), a 74-gun ship of the line
- Conquérant (1812), a Bucentaure-class 80-gun ship of the line
