= Lamour Desrances =

Haitian revolutionary leader

Lamour Desrances (also spelled L'Amour Desrances, Lamour Derance, and Lamour Dérance) was a Haitian revolutionary leader. A former maroon, he was born in Africa and brought to Saint-Domingue as a slave. During the revolution, when local figures often gained power in control of small armed forces, Desrances became a local military leader in the mountains surrounding Port-au-Prince and Saint-Marc.

At the time of the War of Knives, Desrances was loyal to André Rigaud in his battle with Toussaint Louverture, and was one of the few black officers in the predominantly mulatto officer corps of Rigaud's army. After Rigaud's defeat by Louverture, Desrances is referred to as a rebel in Louverture's autobiography. Céligny Ardouin argues that Louverture and Jean-Jacques Dessalines saw Desrances as a growing rival due to his power in the region, and determined to defeat him. Louverture marched on Desrances' forces in November 1801, and they scattered into the local forest.

Two months later, the French forces arrived under Charles Leclerc and during L'Ouverture's open conflict with the French, Desrances notably changed his loyalty to the French under General Pampile de Lacroix to fight against Dessalines' forces. An enemy of L'Ouverture in both instances, L'Ouverture wrote of him: "L’Amour Desrances, who had caused all the inhabitants of the Plain of Cul-de-Sac to be assassinated; who urged the laborers to revolt; who pillaged all this part of the island." The combined force of French and Desrances' and others' local militias defeated Dessalines army at Port-au-Prince and forced their retreat.

In July 1803, Jean-Jacques Dessalines managed to set a trap for Lamour Desrances. He began by seducing him, proposing that they share command of the resistance against the French: Dessalines in the North and the Artibonite region, and Desrances in the West and the South. Then he led him to believe that, having to leave, he was entrusting him with the command of his troops.Too proud to be suspicious, Lamour Desrances came with his officers to review Dessalines' army. . According to the testimony of Colonel Philippe Guerrier, as Desrances entered the ranks of the soldiers, he was suddenly seized and garroted. "Immediately taken under heavy guard to the Marchand plantation in the Artibonite region, Lamour Dérance was held there in irons and died shortly afterward, of grief and misery. He was already quite old.
