= USS Experiment (1799) =

United States Navy schooner

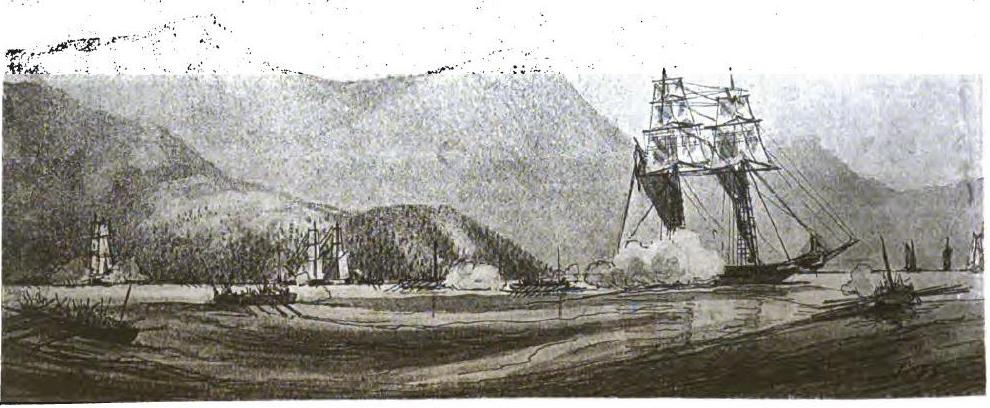
- Experiment during the action of 1 January 1800

History

United States
- Name: USS Experiment
- Laid down: 1799
- Launched: November 1799
- Fate: Sold, October 1801

General characteristics
- Type: Schooner
- Tonnage: 135
- Length: 84 ft 7 in (25.78 m) Keel: 60 feet
- Beam: 22 ft 6 in (6.86 m)
- Draft: 9 ft 6 in (2.90 m)
- Propulsion: Sail
- Complement: 70 officers and enlisted
- Armament: 12 × 6-pounder (3 kg) guns

USS Experiment was a 12-gun schooner of the United States Navy launched in 1799 during the Quasi-War with France.

Experiment was built in 1799 at Baltimore, Maryland and launched in late November under the command of Lieutenant William Maley. The ship was ordered by the US Navy due to a need for small and fast warships to defend American merchant shipping. It was a type of ship known as a Baltimore Clipper.

Experiment joined the squadron commanded by Captain Silas Talbot which was stationed off the French colony of Saint-Domingue, and for seven months, cruised against French privateers in the Caribbean, taking a number of valuable prizes. In the action of 1 January 1800, while becalmed in the Gulf of Gonâve with a convoy of four merchantmen, Experiment was attacked by 14 armed barges loyal to Brigadier-General André Rigaud, a mulatto commander then embroiled in the War of the South with rival general Toussaint Louverture. In the seven hours of fighting that followed, the barges boarded one of the merchantmen, killing her captain, and towed off two other ships of the convoy after their crews and passengers had abandoned them. However, Experiment sank two of the barges, and killed and wounded much of their crews, suffering only one man wounded in return.

On January 12, Experiment captured the schooner Anne. She was sent to Philadelphia where the ship was released by American authorities in July. On February 2, Experiment captured a sloop. On 4 February she captured the schooner Amphitheater, which was made an armed tender for USS Constitution at the end of the month. She also took on February 4 a Danish schooner loaded with Rigaud's troops and a large quantity of ammunition, along with a privateer sloop loyal to Rigaud. The sloop and troops were disarmed, the schooner ransomed and sent to shore with the prisoners. Also on the same day, at around 11 PM Experiment had a brief engagement with an unknown vessel that escaped due to low crew numbers from having so many prizes captured. On February 14, she captured the Spanish brigantine Los Amigos, which was sent to Philadelphia and released by American authorities in September. On February 18, she captured the French schooner L'Legere. On March 29, Experiment captured the Spanish brig San Miguel. On April 8, she captured the Spanish schooner El Carmine for not having papers. On May 15, Experiment captured the schooner Mercator. On June 25, she captured the American slave sloop Betsy off Cuba.

Arriving in the Delaware River early in July 1800, Experiment was refitted, and returned to the West Indies under Lieutenant Charles Stewart, with Maley having been dismissed from the US Navy. On September 1, she captured the French privateer schooner Les Deux Amis. On October 1, she captured the French Navy schooner Diana with Rigaud on board. Again successful in her patrols against the French, she captured several armed vessels. On November 16, she fought a four-hour battle with an unknown vessel, which after striking her colors was discovered to be the British schooner Louisa Bridges. The only casualty of the battle was Experiment's boatswain, who was killed. On December 15, she recaptured the brig Zebra, captured the day before by the French privateer schooner Flambeau. On December 26, she recaptured the brig Dove and sloop Lucy, both of which had been captured by the French privateer schooner Patriote. She also recaptured a number of American merchantmen, and on January 19, 1801, rescued 60 women and children and seven sailors from the Spanish merchantman Eliza, which had wrecked on a reef off Saona Island.

Experiment returned to Norfolk, Virginia in early February 1801. In a letter dated 20 February to Josiah Parker, chairman of the Committee on Naval Affairs, Navy Secretary Stoddert recommended selling her. She was laid up there until August, when Experiment sailed to Baltimore. She was sold there in October 1801 for $7,350.
