= HMS Jersey (1694) =

History

England
- Name: HMS Jersey
- Ordered: 21 July 1693
- Builder: Royal Dockyard, Chatham
- Launched: 17 January 1794
- Commissioned: 19 March 1694
- Fate: Wrecked 9 October 1707

General characteristics
- Type: 20-gun Sixth Rate
- Tons burthen: 262 14/94 bm
- Length: 94 ft 6 in (28.8 m) gundeck; 81 ft 0 in (24.7 m) keel for tonnage
- Beam: 24 ft 8 in (7.5 m) for tonnage
- Depth of hold: 10 ft 8 in (3.3 m)
- Armament: initially as ordered; 20 × sakers on wooden trucks (UD); 4 × 3-pdr on wooden trucks (QD); 1703 Establishment; 20 × 6-pdrs on wooden trucks (UD); 4 × 4-pdr on wooden trucks (QD)

HMS Jersey was a member of the standardized 20-gun sixth rates built at the end of the 17th century. After commissioning she spent most of her career in the West Indies. She was wrecked there in October 1707.

Jersey was the second named vessel since it was used for a 48-gun fourth rate, launched by Starling of Malden in 1654, captured by the French in the West Indies on 18 December 1691, renamed Le Jersey and was in service until 1716.

== Construction ==
She was ordered on 21 July 1693 from Deptford Dockyard to be built under the guidance of Deptford's Master Shipwright, Fisher Harding. She was launched on 17 January 1694.

== Commissioned service ==
She was initially commissioned under the command of Lieutenant John Triggs, RN. Just over a month later Captain Richard Paul, RN took command. Captain Thomas Fisher, RN took command on 11 April 1696 to proceed to the West Indies with a convoy. He died on 7 March 1697. On 10 March 1697 Captain Edmund Bugden, RN took command until he was dismissed by court martial in 1697. The ship was renamed HMS Margate on 21 October 1698.

She was commissioned as HMS Margate around July 1699 under Captain Thomas Urry, RN. Captain Urry died on 18 November 1699. In 1700 she was under command of Captain Philip Dawes, RN for service in America and the West Indies. In 1702 she was under Commander Charles Layton (or Laton), RN for a survey of the Irish coast. Commander John Chilley, RN took command on 6 March 1703 first for service in the North Sea followed by service in the Leeward Islands between 1704 and 1705. She returned home in 1706. On 18 July Commander Samuel Meade, RN took command for service in the Leeward Islands.

== Disposition ==
HMS Jersey was near Cartagena on the Columbian Coast on 9 October 1707.
