= French ship Conquérant (1801) =

Ship of the line of the French Navy

History

France
- Name: Conquérant
- Launched: 9 December 1791
- Acquired: 1801
- Out of service: 21 September 1802
- Stricken: 1804
- Fate: Broken up September 1816

General characteristics
- Length: 53.05 m (174 ft 1 in); 47.55 m (156 ft 0 in) (length on keel)
- Beam: 14.35 m (47 ft 1 in)
- Draught: 7.35 m (24 ft 1 in)
- Armament: 26 × 24 pdr (11 kg) cannon; 28 × 12 pdr (5.4 kg) cannon; 12 × 6 pdr (2.7 kg) cannon

Conquérant (French pronunciation: [kɔ̃keʁɑ̃]) was a 74-gun ship of the line of the French Navy.

She was built in Cartagena (Spain) in 1791 as a 74-gun ship under the name Conquistador, sold to France in 1801 and renamed Conquérant. From December 1801 to January 1802, her guns were reduced from 74 to 66 in Brest (by Tupinier, S ing.).

In May 1802, under Captain Malin, Conquérant left France with the 77th demi-brigade and a Polish Legion (total 1,600pax), bound for to Hispaniola (Sainto Domingo) to support the French troupes against the Haitian Revolution. A day after she left France, she was damaged by a storm. The Conquérant arrived in Hispaniola 14 July 1802 with the troops; and immediately left with deportees (such as Rigaud). She returned safely to Brest in August 1802.

On 21 September 1802, she was disarmed in Brest.

She was stricken from the lists in 1804.
