= War of the South =

1799–1800 armed conflict in Haiti

- Part of the Haitian Revolution and the Quasi-War
- Toussaint Louverture, commander of the northern forces
Date	June 1799 – July 1800
Location	Saint-Domingue
Result	Pro-Toussaint victory: Toussaint assumes control of the entirety of Saint-Domingue; Rigaud & mixed-race officers flee into exile; Reprisals & massacres against Rigaud supporters

Belligerents
Pro-Toussaint forces United States	Pro-Rigaud forces

Commanders and leaders
Toussaint Louverture; Henri Christophe; Jean-Jacques Dessalines	André Rigaud; Alexandre Pétion; Guy Joseph Bonnet

Strength
45,000	15,000

The War of the South (French: Guerre du Sud), not to be confused with the general term knives-war or the War of Knives, was a civil war from June 1799 to July 1800 between the Haitian revolutionary Toussaint Louverture, a black ex-slave who controlled the north of Saint-Domingue (modern-day Haiti), and his adversary André Rigaud, a mixed-race free person of color who controlled the South. Louverture and Rigaud fought over de facto control of the French colony of Saint-Domingue during the war. Their conflict followed the withdrawal of British forces from the colony earlier during the Haitian Revolution. The war resulted in Toussaint taking control of the entirety of Saint-Domingue, and Rigaud fleeing into exile.

== Background ==
=== Early revolution ===
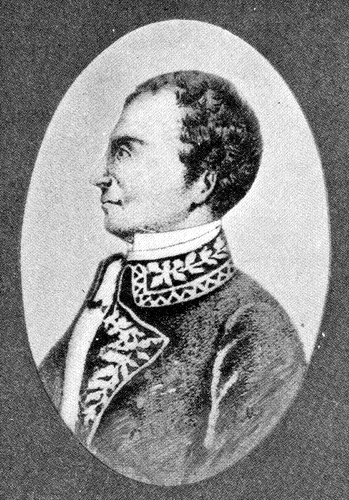
André Rigaud

The Haitian Revolution had begun in 1791, when black slaves on the Caribbean colony of Saint-Domingue rose up against their French owners amidst the French Revolution. Toussaint came to prominence as a leader of rebel slaves in the North of Saint-Domingue, operating in territories surrounding the port of Le Cap-Français. Simultaneously, Rigaud emerged as a rebel leader among the gens de couleur libres (free people of color), who were based in the south of Saint-Domingue, where they had a significant presence around the port of Les Cayes.

In May 1792, Saint-Domingue's French Republican commissioners formed an alliance with Rigaud, allowing him to march his forces into the capital of Port-au-Prince and dissolve the city's restive government of white planters. In August 1793, the new Republican commissioner, Sonthonax, proclaimed freedom for all enslaved persons in Saint-Domingue in an attempt to secure control over the colony in the face of a counter-revolutionary revolt by white planters in Le Cap and invasions by rival European powers as part of the War of the First Coalition. After they abolished slavery, Sonthonax and his fellow commissioner Polverel successfully convinced Toussaint to join the French Republican side of the conflict. Toussaint and Rigaud had become allies by 1794. In early 1795, the French National Convention promoted both men to the rank of brigadier general.

=== Toussaint consolidates power ===
By 1798, Toussaint and Rigaud had jointly contained both the external and internal threats to the colony. In April 1798, the British commander Thomas Maitland approached Toussaint to negotiate a British withdrawal, which was concluded in August. In early 1799, Toussaint also independently negotiated "Toussaint's Clause" with the United States government, allowing American merchants to trade with Saint-Domingue despite the ongoing Quasi War between the U.S. and France. These developments significantly augmented Toussaint's power and demonstrated his emergence as a de facto independent ruler. Going forward, Toussaint and Rigaud effectively controlled all of the troops and territory within Saint-Domingue, although the colony was still nominally under French oversight. Toussaint ruled the colony's northern region around Le Cap and the western region around the capital of Port-au-Prince. Meanwhile, Rigaud independently ruled the southern region around Les Cayes, although Toussaint was technically his superior.

=== Hédouville sows tension ===
In July 1798, Toussaint and Rigaud traveled in a carriage together from Port-au-Prince to Le Cap to meet the recently arrived representative Théodore-Joseph d'Hédouville, sent by France's new Directory regime. Oral tradition asserts that during this carriage ride, Toussaint and Rigaud made a pact to collaborate against Hédouville's meddling. However, those efforts soon came undone, as Hédouville intentionally treated Rigaud with more favor than Toussaint, in an effort to sow tension between the two leaders. In a letter to Rigaud, Hédouville criticized "the perfidy of General Toussaint Louverture" and absolved Rigaud of Toussaint's authority as general-in-chief. He invited Rigaud to "take command of the Department of the South." Hédouville eventually fled Saint-Domingue, sailing from Le Cap in October 1798 due to threats by Toussaint.

== The War ==
=== Outbreak ===
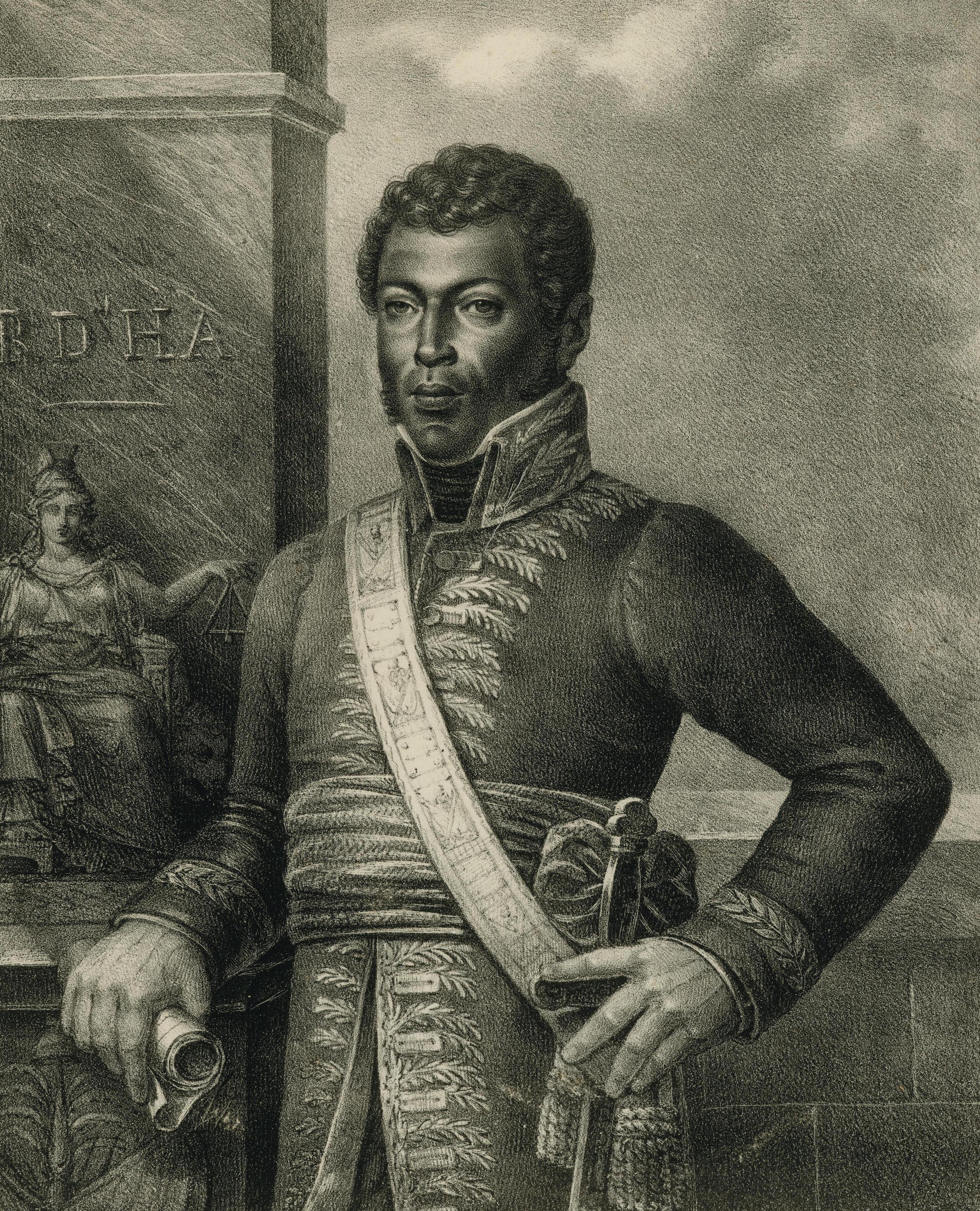
Alexandre Pétion

The conflict took place mainly within Rigaud's domains in the southern part of Saint-Domingue. Rigaud struck first; after slaughtering many whites in South Province to secure his rear, on June 16-18, 1799, Rigaud sent 4,000 troops to seize the southern border towns of Petit-Goâve and Grand-Goâve, routing the smaller forces of Louverture's officer Laplume. Laplume narrowly escaped capture as his army collapsed in a flurry of confusion and desertions. Taking no prisoners, the mulattoes put blacks and whites to the sword. Following this decisive strike, Alexandre Pétion, a free colored officer (and future Haitian president) defected to Rigaud's side, bringing with him a large contingent of veteran troops.

Outside of the South, Rigaud instigated smaller revolts in the northern regions around Le Cap, Port-de-Paix, and Môle-Saint-Nicolas, as well as the west-central Artibonite plain. Many of these regions had repeatedly revolted against Toussaint in the past, in response to his strict labor policies and attempt to accommodate remaining white planters. He tried to establish labor regimes in order to produce enough sugar cane and other commodities for export.

=== Suppression ===
Toussaint responded rapidly to crush the uprisings in the North. Under the leadership of his officers Henri Christophe and Jean-Jacques Dessalines, Toussaint's troops orchestrated widespread executions of suspected conspirators. Meanwhile, in August 1799, Toussaint wrote to U.S. president John Adams, convincing the U.S. Navy to blockade ports controlled by Rigaud. To the United States, Rigaud's ties to France represented a threat to American commerce, which had been harassed by French privateers for the last two years as part of the Quasi-War.

After consolidating his rule in the north by late October, preparations were being made by Toussaint to attack Rigaud in every part of the South. For this invasion, Toussaint possessed a stark numerical advantage; he had 45,000-50,000 troops in his army, compared with Rigaud's 15,000. Early in November, Christophe led one wing of the army against Jacmel, and Dessalines led another one to recapture Grand and Petit Goâve. No small part in the black offensive was played by an American fleet, which destroyed Rigaud's marauding barges, transported blacks to the southern front, and bombarded mulatto positions. For instance, the frigate USS General Greene, commanded by Captain Christopher Perry, providing fire support to the blacks as Toussaint laid siege to Jacmel.

By mid-November, Toussaint's southern offensive was stalled at Jacmel, symbol of mulatto resistance. Led by Pétion, the defenders refused to succumb to fierce attacks by Toussaint's forces. Early 1800 found the city almost without food but still repulsing the slashing assaults of Dessalines' army; one time the blacks even broke inside the beleaguered city, only to be cut off and slaughtered by the defenders. On the night of March 11, 1800, Pétion hacked his way out of Jacmel, but Toussaint's forces fell on his retreating army and killed or captured hundreds of soldiers.

In June, an emissary of France sent by the newly empowered First Consul Napoleon Bonaparte (who had recently overthrown the Directory) reaffirmed Toussaint's position as general-in-chief. This undermined Rigaud's claims that Hédouville had voided Toussaint's authority. By late July, Rigaud had fled the colony with his family to France, and Toussaint entered Rigaud's former base of Les Cayes shortly afterward. By August, 1800, Toussaint was ruler of all Saint-Domingue.

== Aftermath ==
=== Massacres ===
Following his victory over Rigaud, Toussaint declared a general amnesty in July 1800. But Toussaint's general Jean-Jacques Dessalines became infamous during this period for carrying out brutal reprisals and massacres against Rigaud's supporters. Some historians have asserted that Toussaint himself ordered massacres, but delegated the killing to his generals to avoid culpability. The number of victims in these massacres remains disputed: the contemporary French general François Joseph Pamphile de Lacroix suggested 10,000 deaths, while C. L. R. James, a 20th-century historian from Trinidad, later claimed only a few hundred persons had been killed in contravention of the amnesty.

=== Invasion of Santo Domingo ===
Five months after the war, in December 1800, Toussaint ordered an invasion of the Spanish colony of Santo Domingo, which occupied the eastern half of the island of Hispaniola. Although Spain had technically ceded Santo Domingo to France in the 1795 Peace of Basel, the colony was still controlled by a Spanish administration at the time. The invasion was virtually unopposed, and the Spanish governor capitulated a month later.

Toussaint's reasons for invading Santo Domingo remain multifaceted and murky. Throughout the war, the Spanish authorities in Santo Domingo had generally supported Rigaud, fearing Toussaint's own designs on the eastern portion of Hispaniola. Toussaint suspected that the Spanish had also been offering direct military aid to Rigaud; for instance, the gens de couleur officer Antoine Chanlatte had traveled to Santo Domingo in 1800 to acquire munitions for Rigaud's cause. The American consul Edward Stevens claimed that Toussaint had launched the invasion in response to a rumor that France was sending 15,000 troops to Santo Domingo in support of Riguad. Toussaint also claimed that black "French citizens" were being kidnapped and sold as slaves in Santo Domingo. Additionally, Toussaint may have wished to emancipate Santo Domingo's remaining enslaved population, although he made no mention of slavery in his declaration of war.

=== Toussaint's fall from power ===
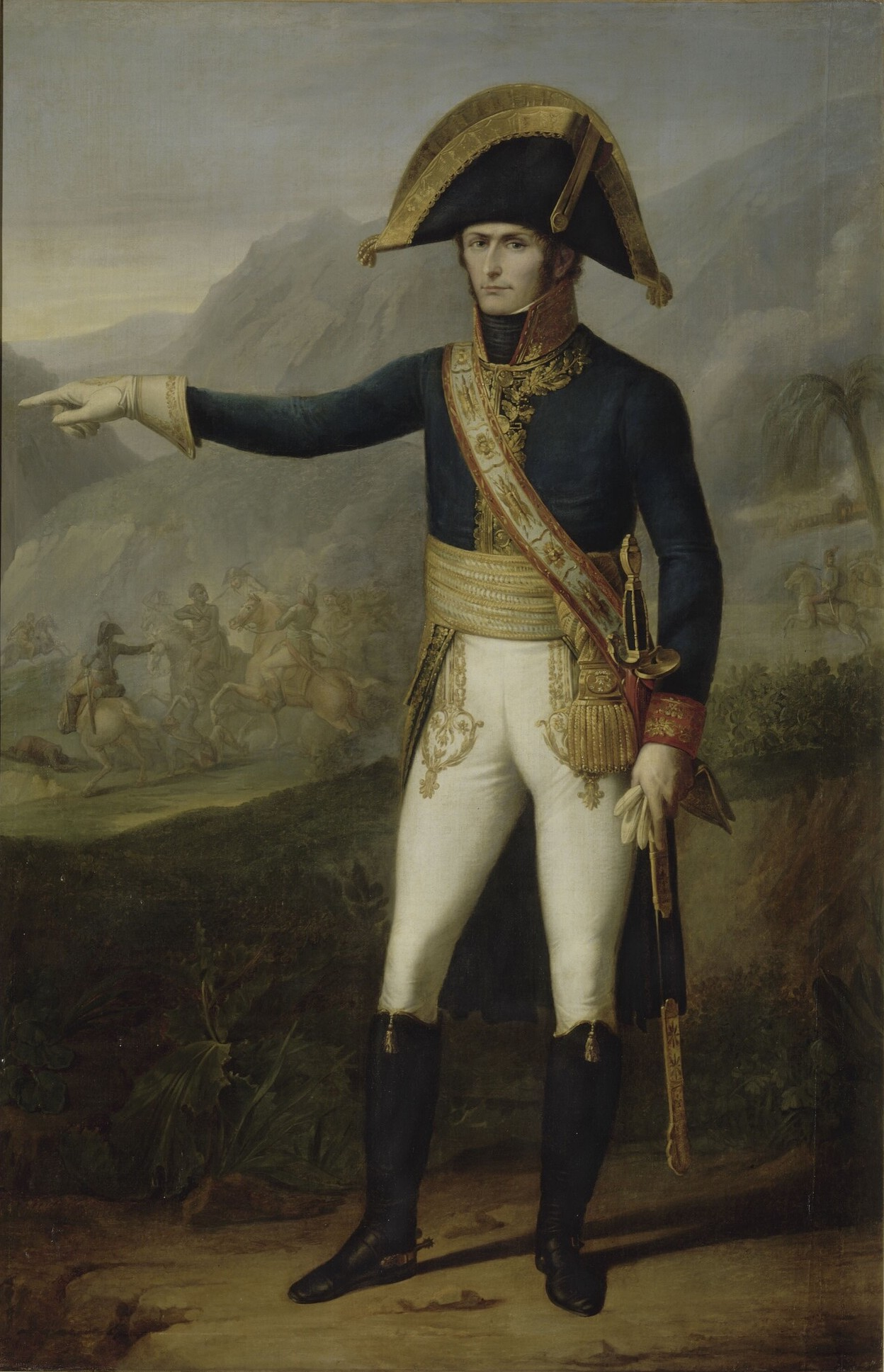
Charles Leclerc

With his victory over Rigaud and conquest of Santo Domingo, Toussaint controlled the entire island of Hispaniola by 1801. However, Rigaud returned less than two years later, when he and his fellow exile Pétion joined Charles Leclerc's unsuccessful 1802 campaign to reassert French control over the colony. During the campaign, Leclerc would deport both Rigaud and Toussaint from Saint Domingue; Toussaint died in a French prison in 1803.

== Not to be confused with the "War of Knives" ==
The War of the South should not be confused with the general terms "knives-war", "war of knives" or "knife war", which may also refer to a number of different massacres with bladed weapons, still vivid in Haitian memories in the 1820s.

The historian Joseph Saint-Rémy recounts how the episode of terror carried out by the Louverturian leadership at the end of the War of the South was nicknamed the "war of the knives" ("guerre des couteaux") by the inhabitants of the South. The French diplomat Gaspard Théodore Mollien, who was stationed in Haiti from 1825 to 1831, reported that the northern revolt of October 1801 in which several hundred white people were murdered was nicknamed the "knife war" ("guerre aux couteaux"). In still another distinct example, historians Thomas Madiou and Beaubrun Ardouin noted the repression of this same northern revolt was also nicknamed the "knives-war" ("guerre-couteaux") because several hundred black workers were bayoneted to death by Louverturian troops.

== Ethnicity and the conflict ==
In presenting the war, historians often point to the ethnic divide between Saint-Domingue's black and mulatto populations. Rigaud, a free mulatto, is seen as being favored by the whites and other mulattoes, who were part of the gens de couleur. In contrast, Toussaint was held in high regard by the colony's black population. Under Rigaud's regime, gens de couleur had filled many officer posts in his army and acquired many abandoned plantation properties in the south. Meanwhile, most of the officers in Toussaint's army were predominately former slaves of African ancestry.

That said, there was still substantial diversity on both sides. Many ex-slaves supported Rigaud's faction, such as the former maroon Lamour Desrances, who was among those who thought that Toussaint was excessively conciliatory to white planters and the British. Both sides claimed that the other intended to betray the Rights of Man propagated by the French Revolution and reinstate slavery.

As a result, historians such as Laurent Dubois argue that the conflict "was not driven by differences in racial identity... it was a conflict over territorial and political power." Both Toussaint and Rigaud had an economic interest in maintaining the colony's plantation system and cultivating economic ties with British and American merchants. The question that remained was whether it would be Toussaint or Rigaud who controlled this renewed system.

== See also ==
- Lamour Desrances
- Saint-Domingue expedition
- Women in the Haitian Revolution
- 1804 Haitian massacre
