= André Rigaud =

Haitian military leader (1761–1811)

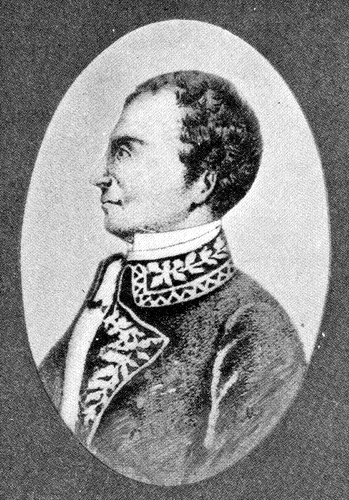
- Born: 17 January 1761; Les Cayes, Saint-Domingue
- Died: 18 September 1811 (aged 50)
- Known for: Revolutionary military leader and General; proclaimed Presidency of the southern state of Haiti in opposition to his protégé, Alexandre Pétion

Benoit Joseph André Rigaud (17 January 1761 – 18 September 1811) was the leading mulatto military leader during the Haitian Revolution. Among his protégés were Alexandre Pétion and Jean-Pierre Boyer, both future presidents of Haïti.

Rigaud rebelled against Toussaint Louverture's government, leading to the War of the South.

== Early life ==
Rigaud was born on 17 January 1761 in Les Cayes, Saint-Domingue, to André Rigaud, a wealthy French planter, and Rose Bossy Depa, a slave woman. His father acknowledged the mixed-race (mulatto) boy as his at a young age and sent him to Bordeaux, where he was trained as a goldsmith.

Rigaud was known to wear a brown-haired wig with straight hair to resemble a white man as closely as possible.

== Revolutionary ==
After returning to Saint-Domingue from France, Rigaud became active in politics. He was a successor to Vincent Ogé and Julien Raimond as a champion of the interests of free people of color in Saint-Domingue, as colonial Haïti was known. Rigaud aligned himself with revolutionary France and an interpretation of the Declaration of the Rights of Man and of the Citizen that ensured the civil equality of all free people.

By the mid-1790s, with slave uprisings in the North, Rigaud was leading an army, a force in the Ouest and Sud departments. He was given authority to govern by Étienne Polverel, one of the three French civil commissioners who had arrived in the colony. Rigaud's power came from his influence with the free black and mulatto planters, found mostly in the South. They were fearful of the masses of former slaves, led by the likes of Romaine-la-Prophétesse, with whom Rigaud refused to ally, and sided instead with the French commissioners who abolished slavery in Saint-Domingue in 1793. Rigaud's soldiers included blacks and whites.

In the South and the West, from 1793 to 1798, Rigaud aided in Toussaint Louverture's decision to re-establish the plantation economy (albeit with paid labor as opposed to slave labor). Although Rigaud respected Louverture, the leading general of the former black slaves of the North and his superior rank in the French Revolutionary Army, he did not want to concede power in the South to him. Rigaud continued to believe in Saint-Domingue's race-based caste system, which put mulattoes just below whites and left blacks at the bottom, a belief that put him at odds with Toussaint. That led to the War of the South in June 1799, when Toussaint's army invaded Rigaud's territory. The Comte d'Hédouville, sent by France to govern the island, had encouraged Rigaud's rivalry with Toussaint.

In 1800, Rigaud left Saint-Domingue for France after his defeat by Toussaint. On 1 October 1800, bound for France aboard the French schooner Diana, Rigaud became a prisoner-of-war when the Diana was captured by the USS Experiment. He was detained in Saint Kitts by the Americans and held there until he was released.

== Leclerc expedition ==
Rigaud returned to Saint-Domingue in 1802 with the expedition of General Charles Leclerc, Napoleon Bonaparte's brother-in-law, who was sent to unseat Toussaint and re-establish French colonial rule and slavery in Saint-Domingue. After the French First Republic abolished slavery in the colony in 1794 after the first slave uprising, the colonial system, based on exports of commodities from sugar cane and coffee plantations, had been undermined. Sugar production fell markedly, and many surviving white and mulatto planters left the island as refugees. Many emigrated to the United States, where they settled in southern cities such as Charleston, or to the Spanish colonies of Cuba or New Orleans. Leclerc was initially successful in capturing and deporting Toussaint, but Toussaint's officers gradually defected and led Black rebels which fought on for almost two more years. Defeated by disease as well as rebel victories, France withdrew its 7,000 surviving troops in November 1803, less than one-third of the forces that had been sent there. Jean-Jacques Dessalines, a black man from the North, led Saint-Domingue to victory and independence and declared Haiti the new name of the nation. He ultimately declared himself emperor.

Rigaud returned to France after the failure of the expedition in 1802–1803. For a time, he was held a prisoner in Fort de Joux, the same fortress as his rival, Toussaint, where the latter died in 1803.

== Final expedition ==
Rigaud returned to Haiti a third time in December 1810. He established himself as President of the State of the South, in opposition to both Alexandre Pétion, a mulatto and former ally in the South, and Henri Christophe, a black man who took power in the North. Shortly after Rigaud's death the following year, Pétion recovered power over the South. Rigaud's tomb is on a small hill between Camp-Perrin and Les Cayes, which has been divided into two to allow a new road to ease transportation.

== Sources ==
- James, C. L. R. (1989). The Black Jacobins (second revised ed.). Knopf Doubleday Publishing. ISBN 9780679724674.
- Kennedy, Roger G. (1989). Orders from France: The Americans and the French in a Revolutionary World, 1780-1820. New York: Alfred A. Knopf. ISBN 0-394-55592-9.
- McGlynn, Frank; Drescher, Seymour (1992). The Meaning of Freedom: Economics, Politics, and Culture after Slavery. University of Pittsburgh Press. ISBN 0-8229-5479-6.
- Parkinson, Wenda (1978). This Gilded African. London: Quartet Books. ISBN 0-7043-2187-4.
- Rogozinski, Jan (1999). A Brief History of the Caribbean (revised ed.). New York: Facts on File, Inc. ISBN 0-8160-3811-2.
