= Mackinaw jacket =

Hip-length coat of blanket-weight wool often in a plaid pattern

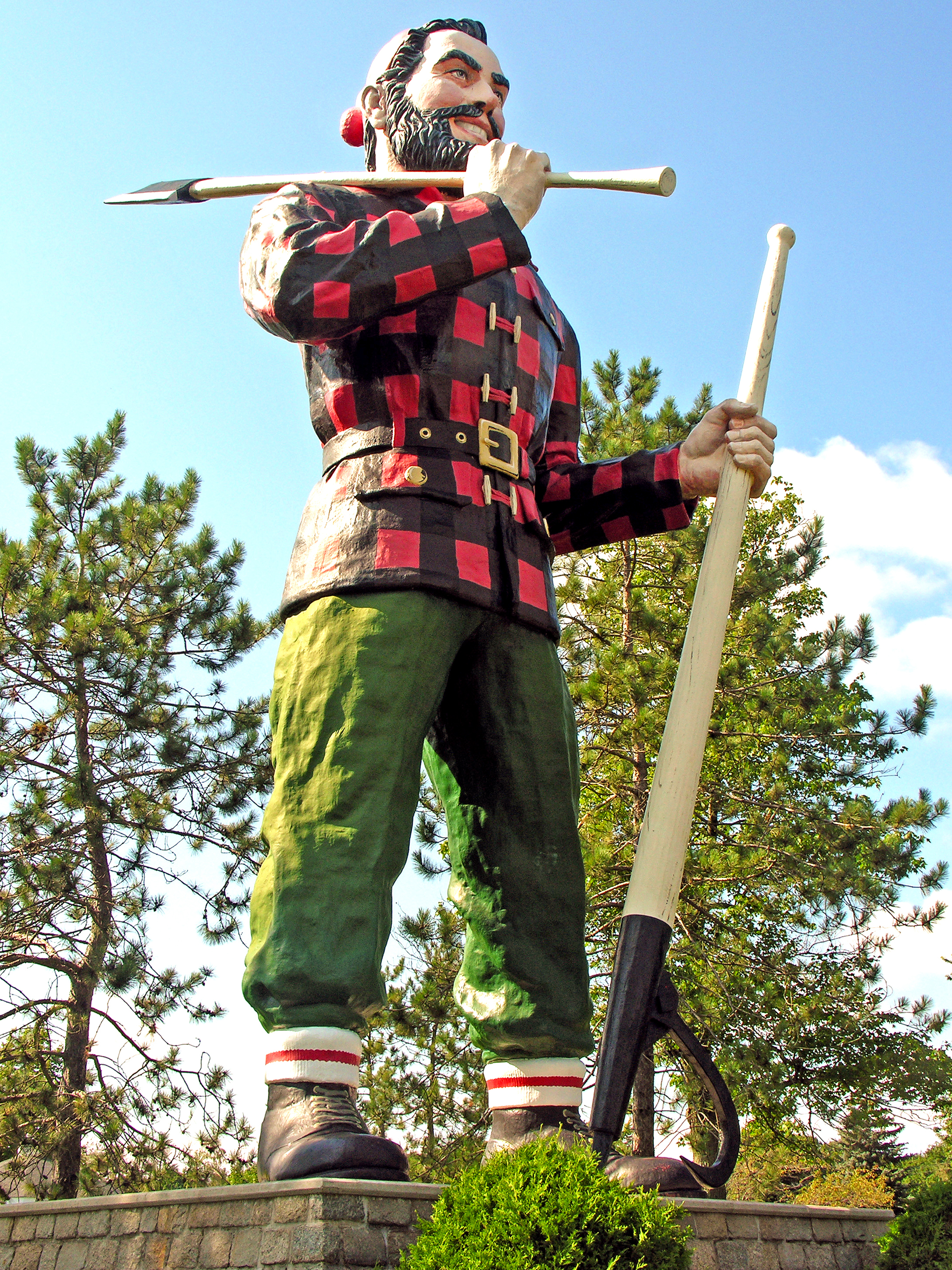
Statue of Paul Bunyan wearing a mackinaw jacket, in Bangor, Maine

The mackinaw jacket, also known as a mackinaw coat, is a short double-breasted coat made of a thick heavy woollen material, often in a red-and-black plaid pattern.

== Etymology ==
The word "mackinaw" is derived from the Odawa Ojibwe language word "Mitchimakinak" meaning a large turtle. When French Canadian fur traders transliterated the word, they spelled it as Michilimackinac, but pronounced the final consonant as "aw" rather than "c". The British later shortened the word and changed the spelling to match the French pronunciation: Mackinaw, though the French spelling was used for Fort Mackinac when constructed in 1780–81.

== Origin ==
The origin of the mackinaw jacket is owed to the British Army Captain Charles Roberts, while commanding Fort St. Joseph along the St. Mary's River near Sault Ste. Marie. Roberts was unable to obtain military-issued winter greatcoats from his general headquarters (G.H.Q.) located in Montreal, Quebec, for the forty soldiers of the 10th Royal Veterans Battalion under his charge. The date was November 20, 1811, and Captain Roberts, wrote a letter by candlelight to the then Captain Thomas Evans, adjutant general in Montreal, Quebec, making a requisition, written as follows:

"All hopes having now ceased of the arrival of the schooner Hunter or any other vessel from Amherstburg with the clothing of the detachment, I am this day obtaining, upon my requisition to the storekeeper of the Indian Department, a consignment of heavy blankets, to make their greatcoats, a measure the severity of the climate strongly demands and one, I trust, the commander of the forces will not disapprove of when he is informed that not a remnant remains of the coats served out to them in the year 1807 and that they have received none since." – Captain Charles Roberts

To alleviate this health and safety concern, Captain Roberts acquired a supply of 3.5-point Hudson's Bay point blankets and requisitioned John Askin Jr., a Métis and keeper of the King's stores at the fort, to design and manufacture forty woollen greatcoats. In response, Askin hired his spouse and eight to ten local Caucasian and Métis women to sew the forty greatcoats, which were completed and presented to Roberts within two weeks. Everyone agreed that the newly tailored greatcoats were of superior quality than the British Army standard issue greatcoats and helped to increase the morale of the King's soldiers.

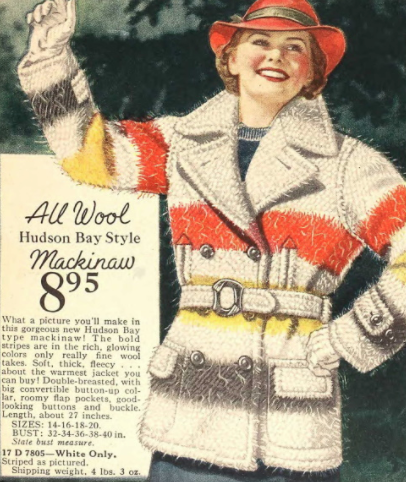
1936 HBC Catalogue

On July 17, 1812, during the War of 1812, Roberts and his men defeated Captain Porter Hanks and the 61 men of the 1st American Artillery Regiment during the siege of Fort Mackinac and then occupied Fort Mackinac located near present-day Mackinaw City, Michigan. Roberts ordered a new supply of Hudson's Bay point blankets from the British Indian Department for the upcoming winter to manufacture more winter coats. The order called for blue coats; however, the number of blue blankets was inadequate and was supplemented with red and black-on-red tartan pattern blankets. This time Roberts had enlisted the aid of professional tailors and seamstresses to produce the greatcoats.

A despatch runner advised that the long length of the greatcoat was impractical for the deep snow drifts when travelling between Mackinaw and Montreal and requested it be replaced by the shorter double-breasted style, which became known as the mackinaw jacket. At first, the mackinaw jacket was produced in blue and was later replaced by the more popular red and black tartan pattern. The new design of the mackinaw jacket was so beneficial for travelling through woods and trails that orders were received from people located from Fort William to Penetanguishene.

More than a century later, when the Hudson's Bay Company began to commercially sell point blanket coats the mackinaw jacket remained popular with their customers.

"In regard to clothing for the body, I will say right here that the man who invented the mackinaw jacket or coat should have a medal if alive and if dead a monument; for in no other garment is there so much all-around common sense for outdoor work in cold weather." – A. F. Wallace

== Poem ==
The mackinaw jacket, created as a child of grim necessity for cold weather conditions, had a short rhyme written about it, adapted from Alfred, Lord Tennyson's Charge of the Light Brigade:

When can its glory fade?
Stout little coat of plaid,
All the north wondered.
Honour the coat they made
Down at the old stockade,
Still made by the hundred.

== Modern times ==
In modern times, the mackinaw jacket has proven to be effective as cold weather workwear and popular among the blue-collar working class including farmers, fishermen, lumberjacks, longshoremen, trappers and outdoorsmen. The demand for the mackinaw jacket has decreased by the end of the 20th century; however, it continues to be manufactured by several companies including: C.C. Filson Co. and Johnson Woolen Mills.

== In popular culture ==
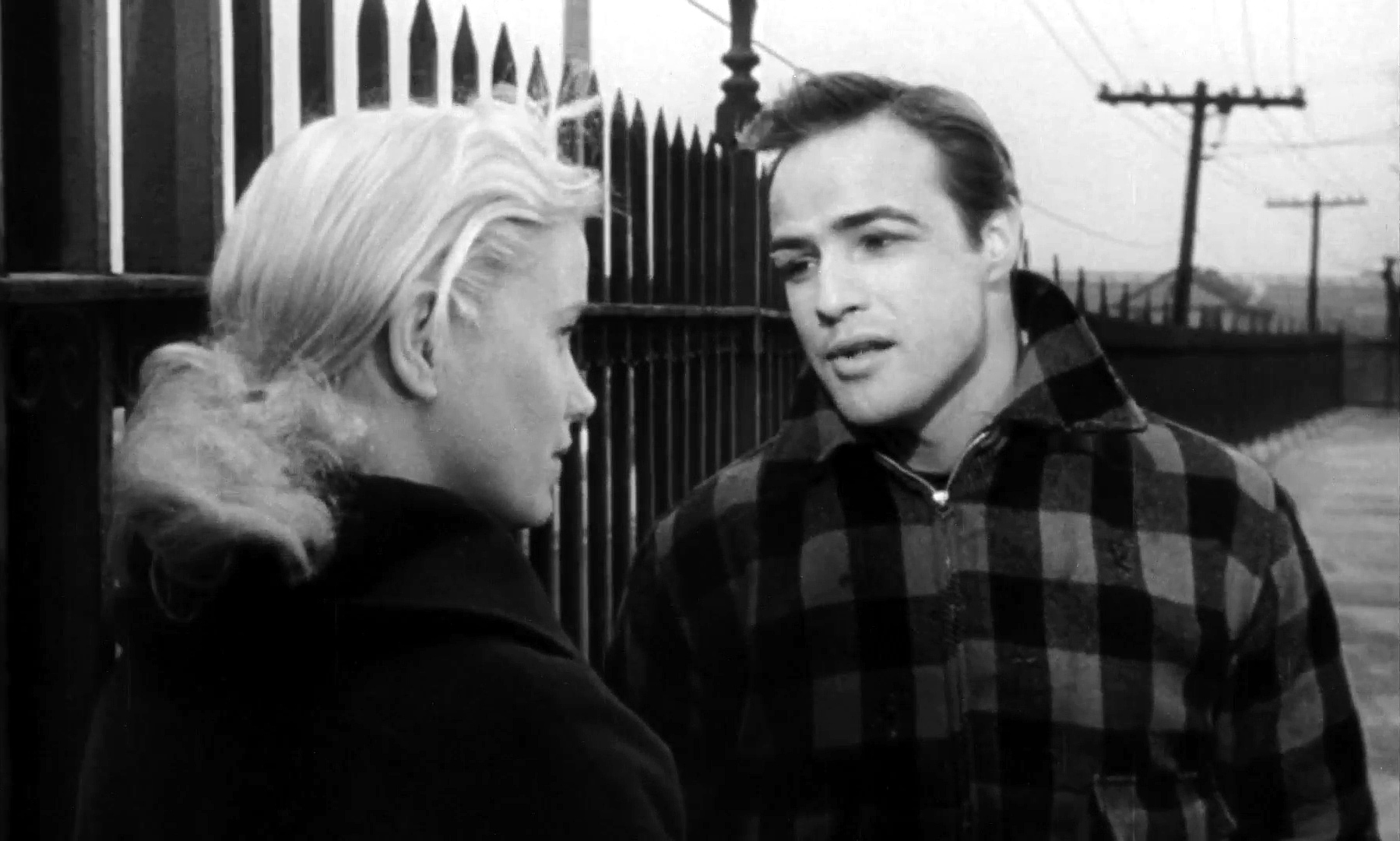
Marlon Brando wearing mackinaw in On the Waterfront, 1954.

- In the 1954 movie On the Waterfront the actor Marlon Brando wore a mackinaw jacket.
- In Ernest Hemingway's short story, The Last Good Country, the character Nick Adams wears a mackinaw jacket.
- On the 1970s television sitcom All in the Family the character Archie Bunker wears a mackinaw jacket on cold days.
- The fictional lumberjack Paul Bunyan is often depicted wearing a mackinaw jacket.
- The Ottawa Redblacks mascot Big Joe wears a mackinaw jacket.
- The mackinaw jackets and shirts were often worn by Vancouver's notorious Clark Park Gang during the late 1960s and early 1970s.
- The Mackinaw jacket is one of the best jackets acquirable in the game The Long Dark and the best non-crafted jacket available on the hardest difficulty of an interloper.

== See also ==
- Mackinaw cloth
- Capote
