= Mackinaw cloth =

Dense woolen cloth used to make jackets

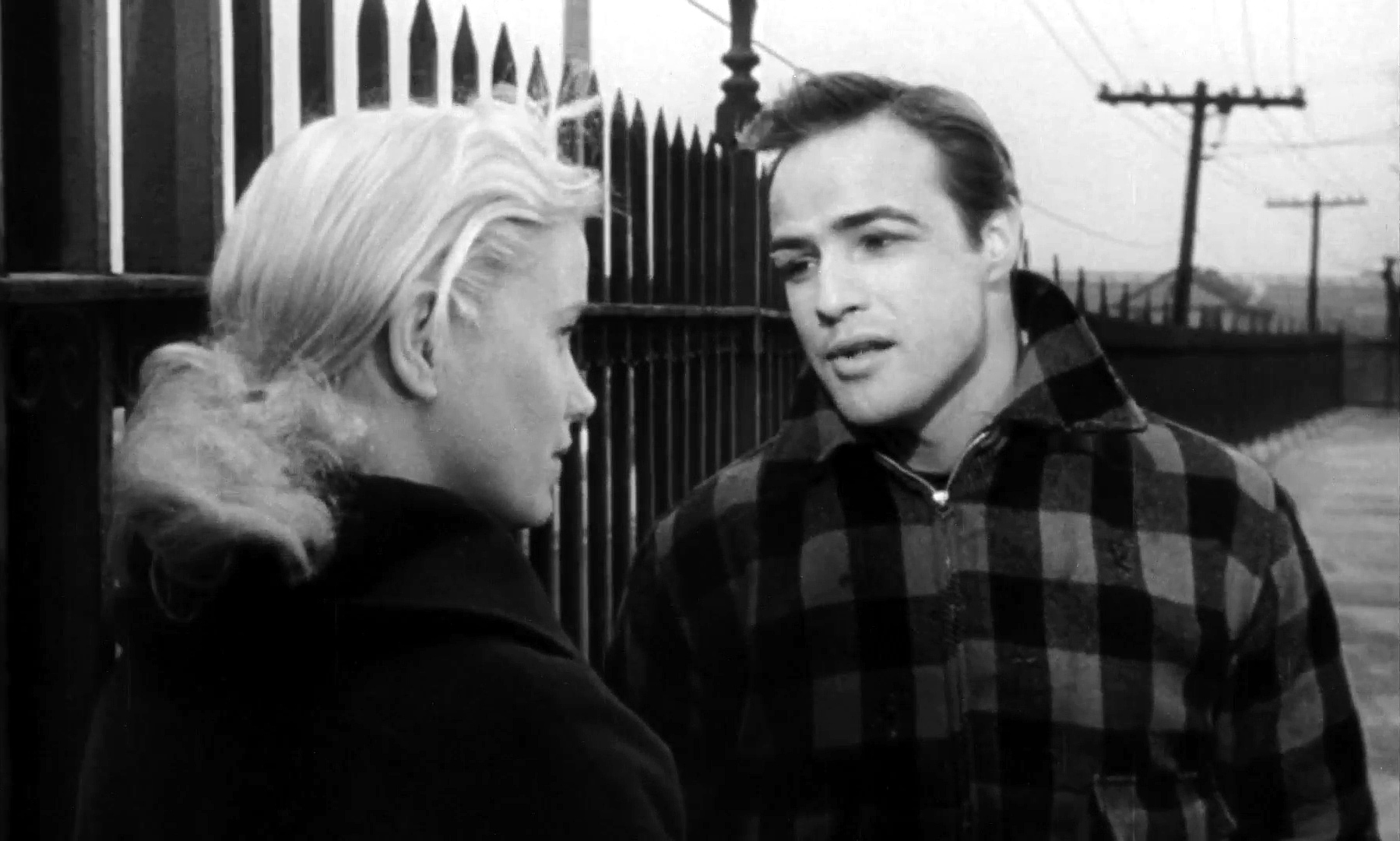
Eva Marie Saint, on the left, and Marlon Brando who is wearing a Pendleton jacket with a zip fastening rather than the conventional buttons, in On the Waterfront, 1954.

Mackinaw cloth is a heavy and dense water-repellent woolen cloth, similar to Melton cloth but using a tartan pattern, often "buffalo plaid". It was used to make a short coat of the same name, sometimes with a doubled shoulder. These jackets have their origins on the Canadian frontier and were later made famous by Canadian and American loggers in the upper Midwest as workwear during the mid-19th century logging boom.

== Origin of the Mackinaw jacket ==
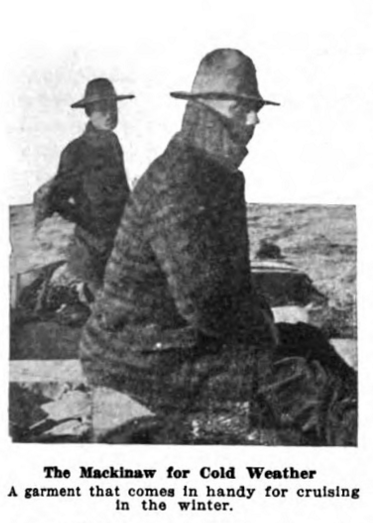

The Mackinac or Mackinaw region in present-day Michigan was an important trade artery during the 18th and 19th centuries; it was named after the Straits of Mackinac, which connect Lake Michigan and Lake Huron. A military force at the straits could also command traffic from and to Lake Superior, which drains into the St. Marys River, which in turn empties into Lake Huron east of the straits. Although Fort Mackinac at Mackinac Island had been ceded by Britain to the newly independent United States in the Treaty of Paris in 1783, the British Army refused to evacuate the posts on the Great Lakes until 1796, when the forts at Detroit, Mackinac, and Niagara were handed over to the Americans. British and American forces contested the area throughout the War of 1812, and the boundary was not settled until 1828, when Fort Drummond, a British post on nearby Drummond Island, was evacuated.

The Mackinaw jacket traces its roots to coats that were made by white and Métis women in November 1811, when John Askin Jr., an early trader on the upper Great Lakes, hired them to design and sew 40 woolen greatcoats for the British Army post at Fort St. Joseph (Ontario), near Mackinac. His wife, Madelaine Askin, took an important role in the design of the coat. Askin was fulfilling a contract he received from Captain Charles Roberts, the post commander; Roberts was desperate to clothe his men, who had last been issued greatcoats in 1807. The jackets were made from three-point trade blankets that Askin, who at the time was keeper of the King's store at the fort, supplied on the captain's authority. Although the order called for blue coats, the number of blue blankets proved insufficient, so the number was filled out by coats made from blankets in red as well as the black-on-red tartan pattern that is associated with the jackets of today. The long skirts of the greatcoat were unsuitable for deep snow, and once these were removed, the Mackinaw jacket was born.

Mackinaw blankets are referenced by Josiah A. Gregg in his 1844 book Commerce of the Prairies about trade on the Santa Fe Trail. He notes that these were contraband, subject to confiscation by Mexican customs officers, but that they could be concealed between the double layers of Osnaburg sheet fabrics which formed the roof of covered cargo wagons.

== Modern use ==
=== From workwear to sportswear ===
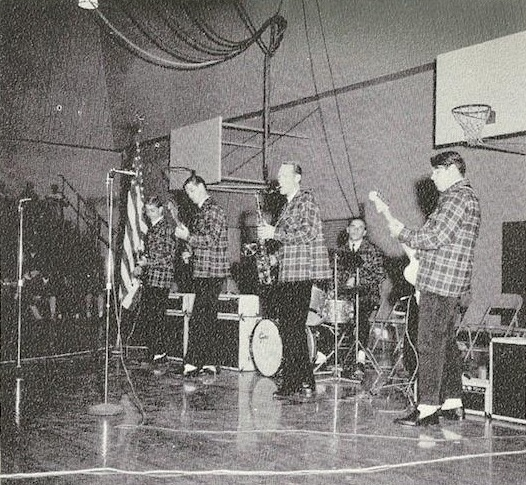
The Beach Boys, 1963.

In the days of the Old West, heavyweight "buffalo plaid" tartan Mackinaw jackets were worn with knit caps by American and Canadian lumberjacks in the Midwest, Northwest territories and Alaska. By the 1930s, the jacket had also found widespread use as sportswear among hunters and fishermen, together with a knit cap. A variant of the Mackinaw in olive drab was issued to the US Army for cold weather use by Jeep crews. After the war, plaid jackets of this type, manufactured under the Pendleton brand, became popular casual wear for American men as an alternative to the Hollywood jacket.

=== Use by teenagers ===
During the 1960s Pendleton overshirts were widely worn by surfers and surf rock groups such as the Beach Boys. In the late '60s and early '70s "Mac" jackets became standard apparel that helped define the image of Vancouver's notorious Park Gangs, whose members came from tough, working class, logging and labouring families. The jacket made another comeback among the 1990s grunge, hardcore punk and skater subcultures due to its cheapness, durability, warmth, and protection from falls when skateboarding. It is also occasionally seen on members of the 2010s hipster subculture due to its practical but timeless feel.
