= Battle of Mackinac =

Battle of Mackinac may refer to the following during the War of 1812:

- Siege of Fort Mackinac, a battle in 1812
- Battle of Mackinac Island (1814)
