= Hudson's Bay point blanket =

Wool blanket traded by Hudson's Bay Company

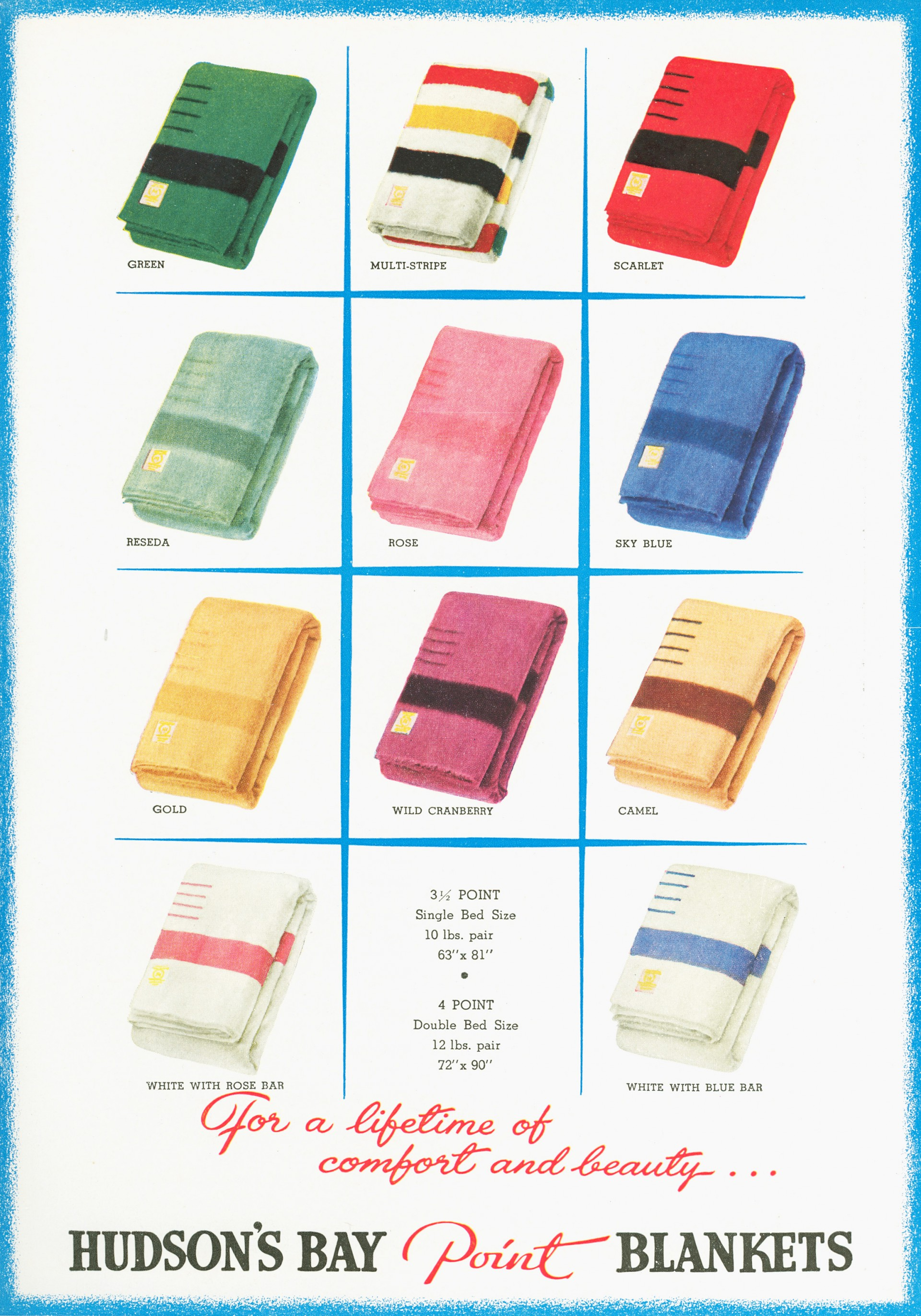
HBC blanket advertisement from the September 1952 issue of The Beaver (HBC magazine).

Hudson's Bay point blankets are woollen blankets originally made for the Hudson's Bay Company (HBC) in British North America, now Canada and the United States. Manufactured in England since 1779, historically they served as a form of currency during the North American fur trade exchanged with First Nations for beaver pelts. Sold by HBC trading posts, they were often hand made into winter clothing (specifically capotes and mackinaws) worn extensively by voyageurs (European fur traders) and Indigenous peoples. Beginning in the 20th century, an HBC factory-made "point blanket coat" was popularized amongst the population of Canada to the extent that it was looked on as a national dress. HBC point blankets have become part of the Canadian identity representing a nationally shared cultural symbol.

The points system, marked by thin lines woven into the side of each blanket, indicates the overall size of a blanket. These lines originally allowed traders to identify blanket size at a glance. By the mid-20th century as bed sizes became standardized the point system came to indicate modern sizes, with 3.5 points denoting twin size, 4 points a double, 6 points a queen, and 8 points a king.

The colour schemes of the blankets, including the multi-stripe version, historically known as "Queen Anne colours", have expanded into fashion, and lifestyle products. These "Bay 'stripe' branded products" were exclusively sold by Hudson's Bay department stores (the Bay) and affiliates until HBC intellectual property rights were purchased by Canadian Tire in 2025 during the liquidation of HBC assets.

The Blanket Fund (Oshki Wupoowane), which receives 100% of the net proceeds from Hudson's Bay Point Blankets, is an Indigenous charity created to acknowledge HBC's settler colonial history and advance truth and reconciliation. The fund provides grants to "grassroots Indigenous organizations for cultural, artistic, and educational initiatives".

== History ==
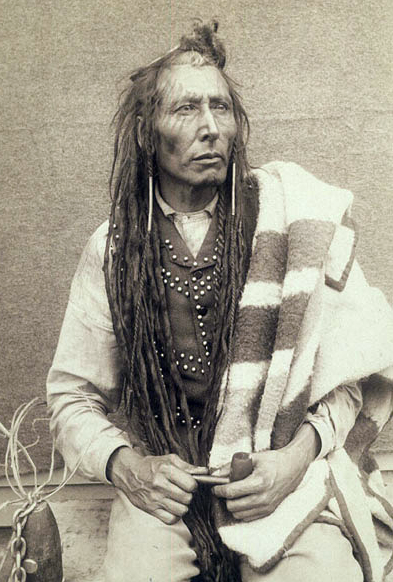
Poundmaker, a Plains Cree chief, wearing a Hudson's Bay "chief's blanket" ca.1885

During the North American fur trade, beginning in the 1670s, Hudson's Bay Company trading posts and rival trading posts, such as those operated by the North West Company, served as the primary sources for woollen blankets and accessories required to make clothing from them. Wool blankets of all kinds were used as robs, saddle blankets, curtains and canoe sails, and made into mittens, socks, pants and most commonly hooded coats called capotes by both Indigenous and French Canadian voyageurs. By the early 1700s random wool blankets accounted for a large percentage of traded goods, serving as a form of soft currency in some regions.

The French fur trader Germain Maugenest is thought to have advised HBC to introduce point blankets of their own. In 1779, the first "definite record" of an order of 500 point blankets was produced for HBC. In 1798 the first documented multiple stripe purchase order was for "30 pair[s] of 3 points to be striped with four colours (red, blue, green, yellow) according to your judgement", to be manufactured in Witney, Oxfordshire. The colours chosen for the stripes are believed to have been popularized during the Queen Anne's era of style. They were not officially her colours, but rather were highly fashionable, easily produced dyes for textiles of the period.

Within some Indigenous nations, the early broad multi-striped version was referred to as "chief's blankets" due to their rarity. First Nations and Métis had long integrated textiles into their spiritual and ceremonial societies. In a 2017 piece for Canadian Art magazine, Métis novelist Chelsea Vowel stated that the blankets are "highly valued" in certain Plains Indigenous groups and are still given as gifts or utilized in communal rituals.

The modern order of green, red, yellow and indigo (very dark blue) was not standardized until the middle to the end of the 1800s. Most blankets manufactured during the 1800s were plain white, scarlet (red), green, or blue, with single indigo stripe at each end. By the early 1940s about 25 different colours were available, until the 1960s when only 5 colours and the multi-stripe version were marketed. By the mid 20th century, the multi-stripe version had become popular as a marker of national identity, now commonly associated with "Canadian cottage culture". They would also come to be associated with Canada's colonial history, a tangible centuries-old symbol of an era of cultural assimilation and diseases transmission.

=== Blanket coats ===
Point blankets, being made of sheep wool, were easier to sew together than traditional material such as hides, and were waterproof and warm. Beginning in 1706, HBC trading posts started locally assembling their own clothing, including capotes, with each trading post having its own tailor by the late 1700s.

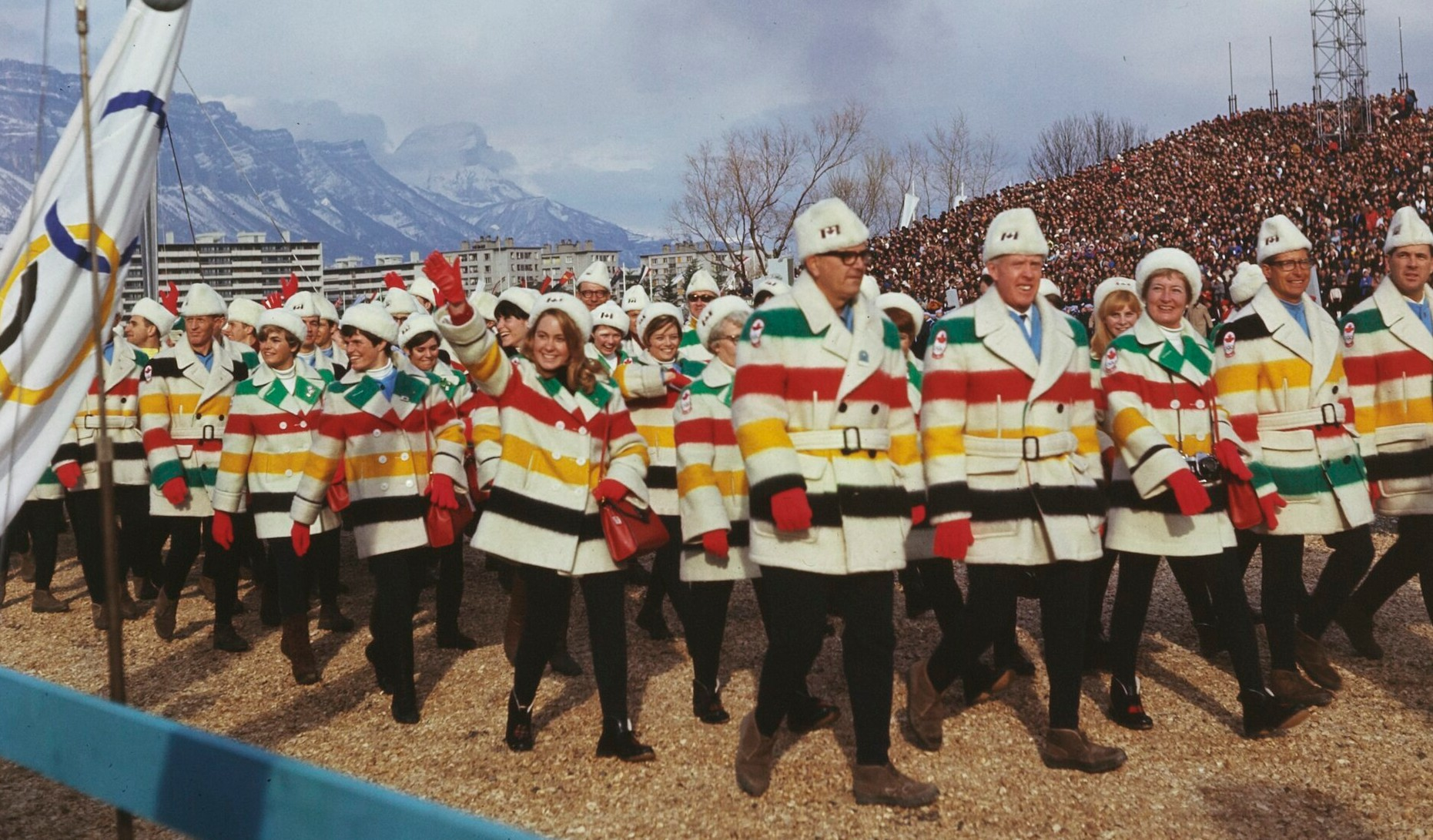
Team Canada at the opening ceremonies of the 1968 Winter Olympics. This was the first Winter Olympics in which the new Maple Leaf Flag was used to represent the country.

The origin of the mackinaw jacket is credited to the British Army Captain Charles Roberts. In 1811, at Fort St. Joseph there was a shortage of greatcoats for the King's soldiers. Captain Charles Roberts, wrote a letter to Captain Evans, Adjutant General in Quebec, making a requisition for heavy blankets. Roberts requisitioned HBC 3.5-point blankets from the British Indian Department to manufacture greatcoats for his troops. John Askin Jr., a Métis and keeper of the King's stores at the fort, hired local women to design and manufacture 40 woollen greatcoats.

HBC began to produce factory-made point blanket coats commercially in 1922, blending the features of mackinaw jackets and capotes. HBC point blanket coats came in a variety of colours and would become considered a "national dress". Beginning in 1936, and through the 20th century Canadian athletes donned HBC style point jackets during the opening ceremonies of multiple Winter Olympics. HBC point blanket coats were last produced in 2000. "Hudson's Bay Stripes" are considered one of Canada's iconic official Olympic styles, that was part of a long tradition of HBC dressing Canadian athletes. HBC last dressed Canadian athletes for the Tokyo 2020 Summer Olympics, which took place in 2021.

== Modern branding ==
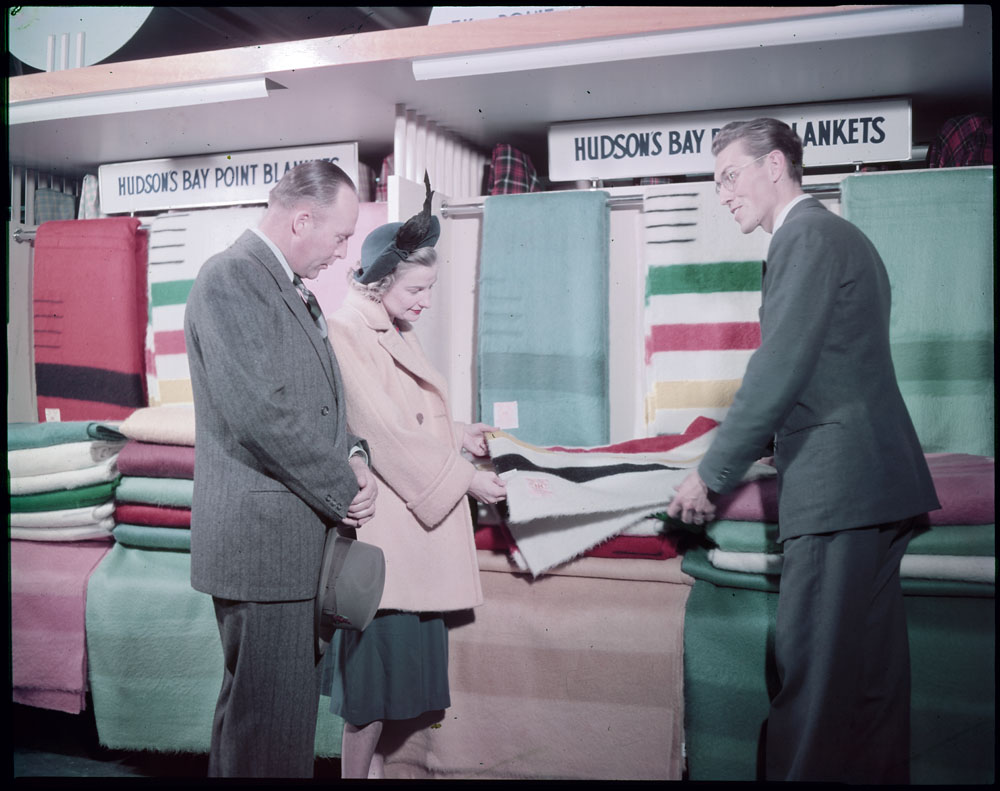
Point blankets at the Bay in Winnipeg, Manitoba, ca 1949. Winnipeg was the location of HBC's first department style store opened in 1881.

Beginning in the early 20th century, HBC point blankets were made available at Hudson's Bay department stores (the Bay) constructed throughout Canada over the course of a century. In 2025, Canadian Tire, a national retail corporation, acquired HBC brand rights and its intellectual property for $30 million, announcing the continuation of Hudson's Bay point blankets and related Hudson's Bay stripes products online and at its over 500 national outlets and a limited collection available through its affiliate Mark's with over 350 locations.

The blankets have always been made in England; today they are manufactured by John Atkinson, a sub brand of A.W. Hainsworth & Sons Ltd. Wools from Britain and New Zealand are used in the manufacture of blankets. As of 2026, they are available in multiple colours and four different bed sizes. A smaller wool version, called the "Hudson's Bay Caribou Throw", alongside a cotton knit throw blanket and fleece throw blanket are marketed as less expensive alternatives. Replica multi-striped products, particularly the "Glacier National Park Blanket" by Pendleton Woolen Mills, are part of the consumer environment.

=== Hudson's Bay Stripes ===
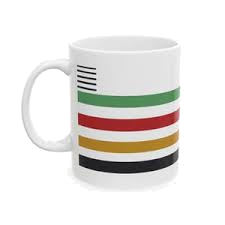
HBC striped ceramic mug featuring "Queen Anne's colours" and "Point" markings

HBC branded products are marketed as Canadiana cultural items, that have expanded from blankets and coats styled from them into a wide range of fashion apparel, accessories, home decor, and specialty seasonal items, including; clothing (sweaters, mittens, socks, bikinis and tote bags), home accessories (sheets, towels, cushions, curtains, cookware and umbrellas), and nostalgic items (teddy bears, rowing paddles, bats, candy canes, stockings, nutcrackers and ornaments).

Partnerships to incorporate "Bay 'stripes'" with other iconic brands have been commissioned throughout the years, most notably the HBC striped canoe, by Langford canoes, Canada's oldest canoe company, a joint venture with Mattel to create an HBC striped Barbie, "cross-branded" barware accessories with Steam Whistle Brewing and "special editions" Levi's apparel and Converse footwear.

As a result of their cultural significance, "Bay stripes" have been featured in the works of historic and contemporary artists. In the 21st century home decor featuring "HBC stripes" themed elements have become a part of Canadiana style.

== Blanket fund ==

The history of HBC point blankets is not without controversy due to their connection with Canada's colonial history. Indigenous oral storytelling passed down for generations suggests that blankets and clothing of all types given to Indigenous communities in the 1700s and 1800s caused the spread of smallpox. In light of its settler colonialism ties, reconciliation efforts began in 2022 with the formation of the "Oshki Wupoowane", also known as The Blanket Fund, with an initial investment of $1 million from the Hudson’s Bay Foundation. The fund receives 100% of net proceeds from Hudson’s Bay Point Blanket sales. After Canadian Tire acquired HBC’s intellectual property rights, they pledged to continue supporting the fund ensuring at least $1M annually regardless of sales. The fund supports Indigenous cultural, artistic, and educational activities through two grant streams, benefiting Indigenous-led initiatives and organizations in Canada.

Not all blankets featuring Bay stripes are point blankets with funds going to the "Blanket fund". The retailer's "caribou multistripe throw," as well as blankets made of cotton, cashmere, or fleece are for profit items.

== Collectibility ==
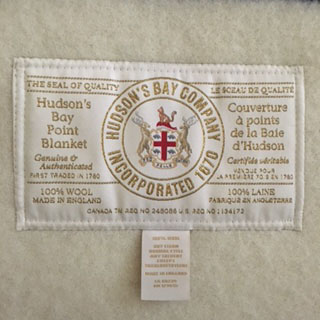
HBC point blanket label April 2017

In 1890, HBC began adding labels to their blankets because point blankets of similar quality were being sold by HBC competitors. Historic competitors include; C.C. Filson, Pendleton Woolen Mills, Faribault Woolen Mill Company, MacAuslands Woollen Mills, and Early's of Witney, which historically manufactured point blankets for HBC for over a century, and ceased operations in 2002.

Many HBC branded products have become collectibles, with genuine HBC point blankets being the most sought after and valuable. The main determinants of value include age, size, colour, pattern rarity, and condition. Particularly collectible are "unseparated pairs", (Note: Doubly long blankets were once woven in continuous rolls of about 25 pairs (50 singles) and separated into pairs by manufacturers until the 1970s. Prices were set by the pair until 1973 when there use as sleeping bags was surpassed by modern materials and the urbanization of Canada.) the Coronation blankets: the one produced for the 1953 coronation of Queen Elizabeth II and the rarer 1937 coronation. Modern collectibles include the 2006 single pink strip on a white background in support of the Canadian Breast Cancer Foundation, and the blue and green multi-striped version for the 2010 Vancouver Olympics.

=== Collections ===
HBC point blankets are held in many museums, most notably at the Manitoba Museum in Winnipeg, which houses over 27,000 HBC items. The Canadian Museum of History has many HBC artifacts, including blanket coats used in the 1964 Olympic games. The Glenbow Museum collection includes items such as Siksika (Blackfoot) capotes and photographic records. Tamástslikt Cultural Institute displays a larger collection of HBC point blankets.

== Point system (sizes) ==
External videos
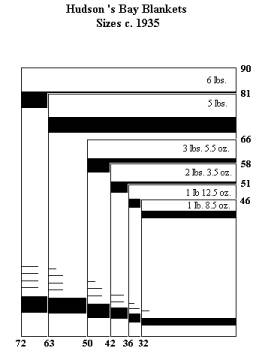
- " HBC Point Blanket." – - HBC History Foundation (3:56 min)

Points are short lines woven into the selvage of the blanket along the edge just above the bottom set of stripes. About 4 inches (10 cm) in length (except in the case of half points, which are 2 in [5.1 cm]), they indicate the finished overall size (area) of a blanket and allow easy determination of the size of a blanket – even when folded. French weavers invented the point system in the mid-1700s since then, as now, blankets were shrunk as part of the manufacturing process. The word point derives from the French empointer, meaning "to make threaded stitches on cloth".

Over the centuries the sizes of blankets have shifted, particularly during the twentieth century as beds became larger. Blankets of 2.5, 3, 3.5 and 4 point were most common during the fur-trade era. Today, Hudson's Bay blankets are commonly found in point sizes of 3.5 (twin bed), 4 (double), 6 (queen) and 8 (king).

- 1 point – 32 in × 46 in (81 cm × 117 cm), weight 1 lb 8.5 oz (0.69 kg) (traditionally for cribs)
- 1.5 point – 36 in × 51 in (91 cm × 130 cm), weight 1 lb 12 oz (0.79 kg), (crib size)
- 2 point – 42 in × 58 in (107 cm × 147 cm), weight 2 lb 3.5 oz (1.01 kg)
- 2.5 point – 50 in × 66 in (127 cm × 168 cm), weight 3 lb 5.5 oz (1.52 kg)
- 3 point – 60 in × 72 in (152 cm × 183 cm), weight 4 lb 3 oz (1.90 kg)

Modern point sizes

- 3.5 point – 63 in × 81 in (160 cm × 206 cm), weight 5 lb (2.27 kg), (twin size)
- 4 point – 72 in × 90 in (183 cm × 229 cm), weight 6 lb (2.72 kg), (double size)
- 6 point – 84 in × 92 in (213 cm × 234 cm), queen size (1960s)
- 8 point – 108 in × 100 in (274 cm × 254 cm), king size (1980s)

The misconception persists that originally the points were an indication of a blanket's price in beaver pelts or even its weight. The number of pelts required to buy a blanket ranged widely by time and location, regardless of its size. Thickness and quality are the same blanket to blanket, and a larger blanket will naturally weigh more.

== Name in First Nations languages ==
The Hudson's Bay blanket is called by different names in First Nations languages. Some examples are:

- Baahlaads gyaa'adaay, Haida language
- ʔa·q̓unaq, Kutenai language

== Gallery ==
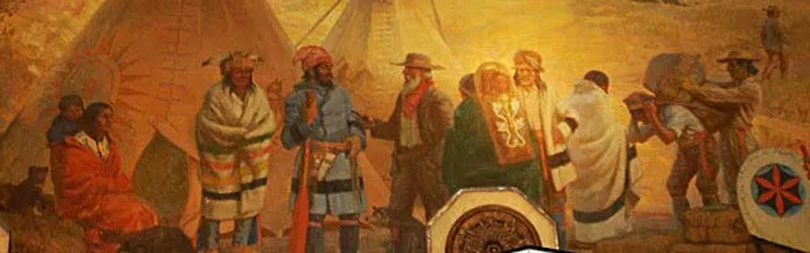
"Pioneer at Fort Garry 1861" - Métis and settlers wearing Point Blankets and engaged in trade" by Adam Sherriff Scott ca.1925
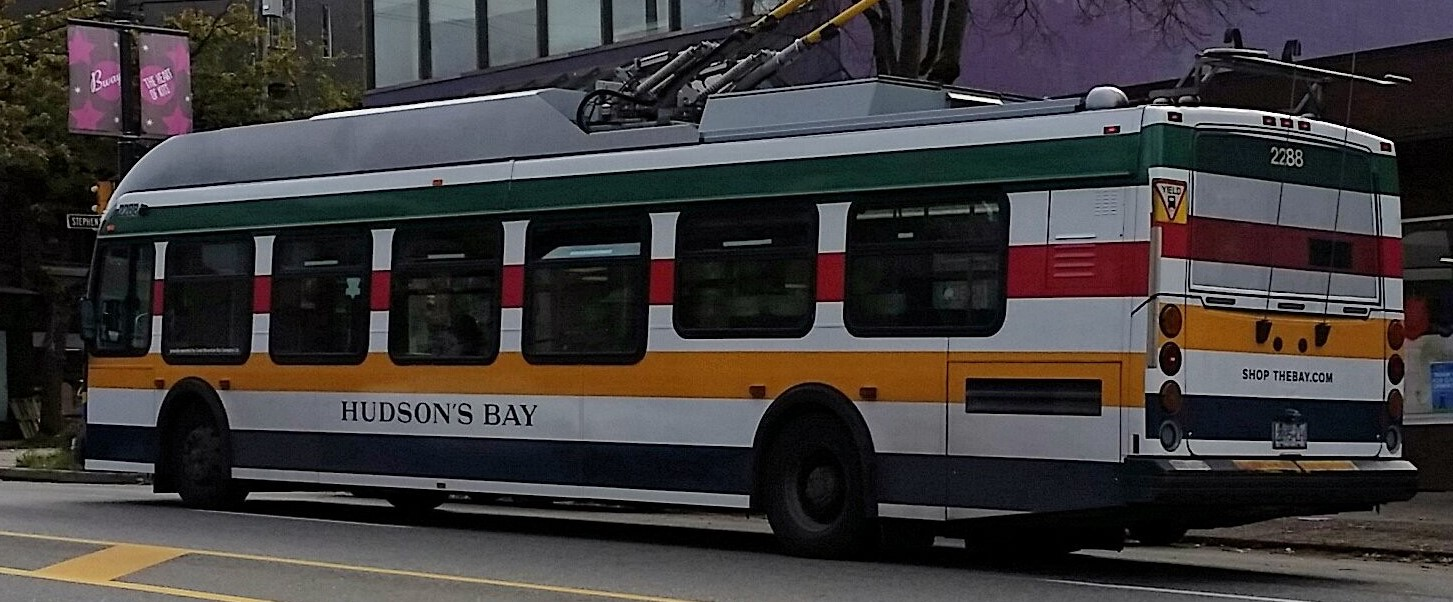
Trolley bus in Vancouver B.C with the Bay's multi-stripe design, 2015
Packaging label for special-edition blanket

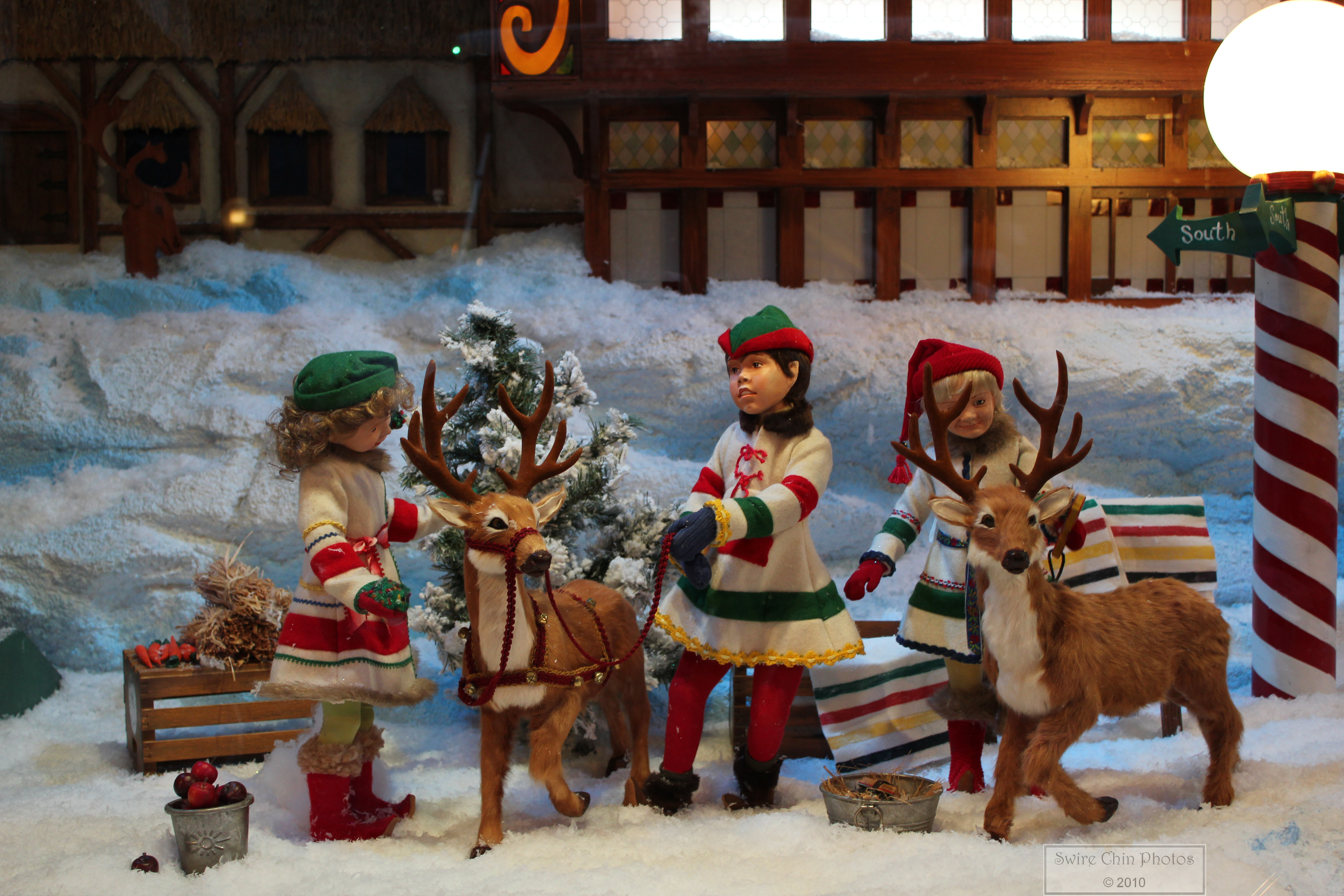
Annual Christmas window display at HBC flagship downtown Toronto store, 2010

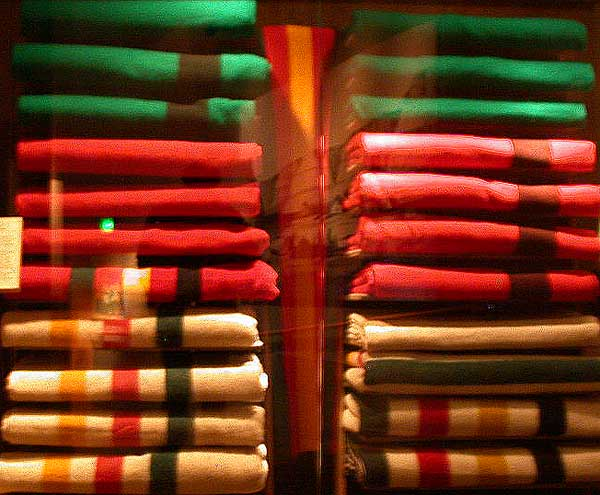
HBC point blankets on display at the Tamástslikt Cultural Institute on the Umatilla Indian Reservation near Pendleton, Oregon, US

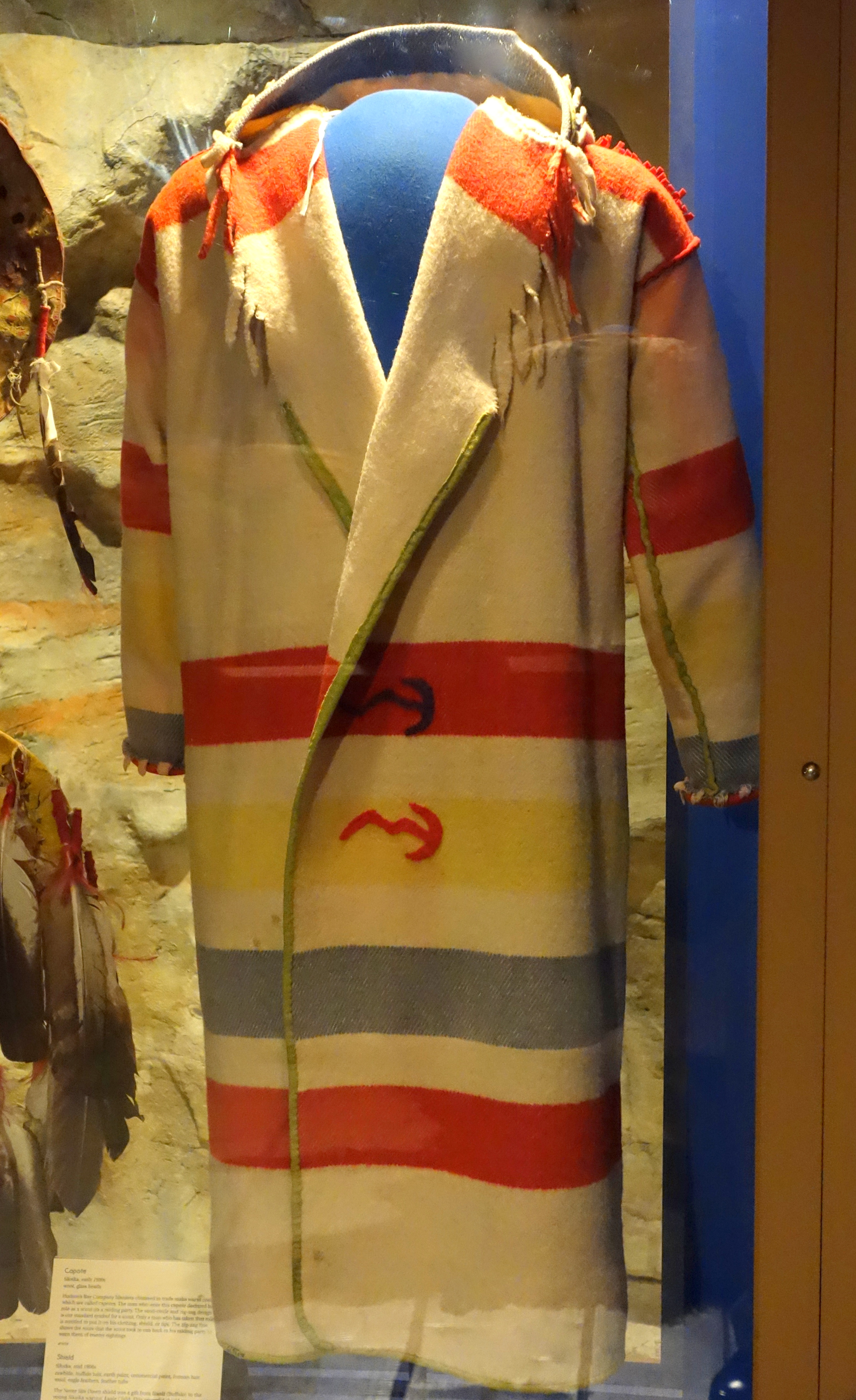
Siksika Blackfoot capote made from an HBC point blanket with glass beads, Glenbow Museum, Alberta, Canada, early 1900s

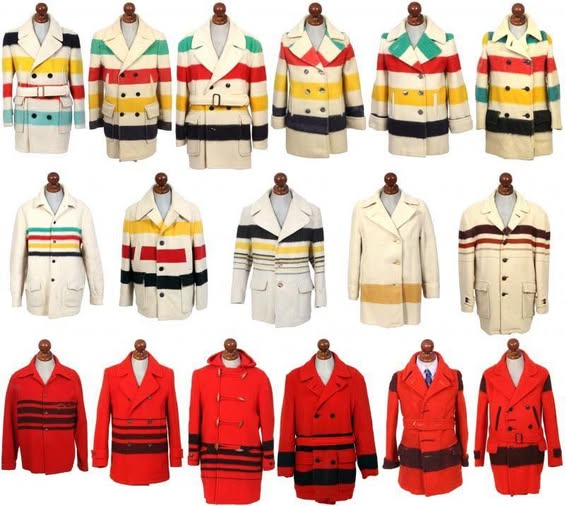
HBC point jackets 1952 catalog

== See also ==
- Afghan (blanket) – Type of blanket
- Buffalo coat – Heavy winter garment
- Button blanket – Wool blanket embellished with mother-of-pearl buttons
- Chilkat weaving – Northwest Coast weaving style
- Ceinture fléchée – Traditional French-Canadian wool sash
- Hudson's Bay Company Archives – Canadian provincial archives
- Lizhnyk – Hutsul wool blanket and rug
- Patchwork quilt – Quilt with a design of pieces of fabric
- Regional tartans of Canada
