= The Sons of the Desert =

Laurel and Hardy appreciation society

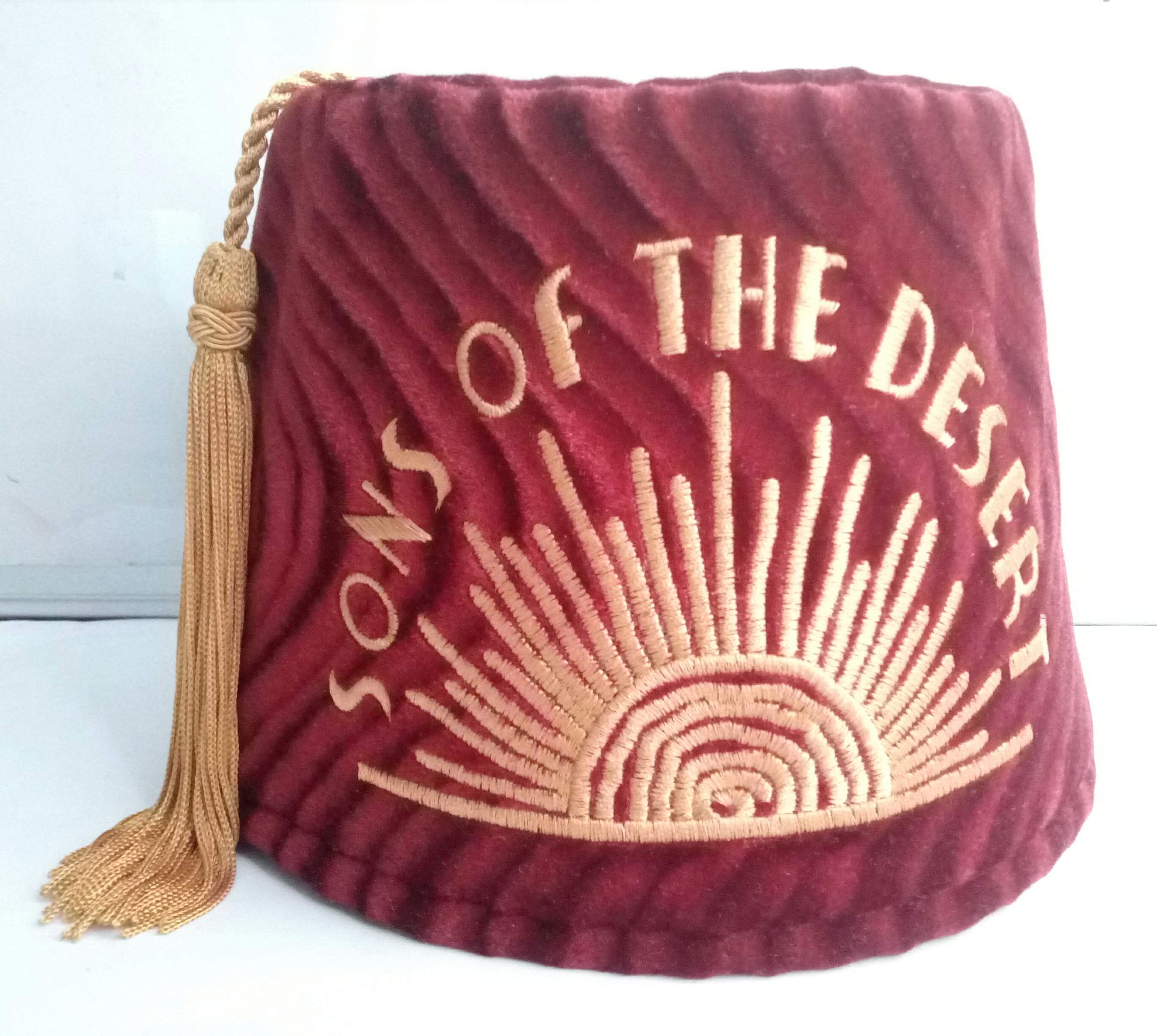
- The fez, worn occasionally by some members
- Founded: 1964
- Founder: John McCabe
- Type: Fanclub, Non-profit organization, fraternal organization
- Location: Natick, Massachusetts
- Region served: Worldwide
- Website: www.sonsofthedesertinfo.com

The Sons of the Desert is an international fraternal organization devoted to the lives and films of comedians Stan Laurel and Oliver Hardy. The group takes its name from a fictional lodge that Laurel and Hardy belonged to in the 1933 film Sons of the Desert.

In keeping with the tongue-in-cheek “desert” theme, each local chapter of the society is called a “tent,” and each tent is named after one of the Laurel and Hardy films and designated with an "Oasis number" (e.g., the Chicago Bacon Grabbers is Oasis #10). There are more than 100 active tents worldwide, mostly in the United States and United Kingdom. Members meet regularly to enjoy Laurel and Hardy movies in an informal atmosphere. Many chapters formed in the 1960s are still active today.

== History ==
In 1964, three years after the book biography Mr. Laurel and Mr. Hardy by John McCabe was published, McCabe formed a small group of Laurel and Hardy admirers, including actor Orson Bean, cartoonist Al Kilgore, TV personality Chuck McCann, and John Municino. McCabe created a mock-serious “constitution” that satirized the formalities of many social organizations. Stan Laurel endorsed and humorously revised the document; he suggested that members might wear a fez or blazer patch with the motto "Two Minds Without a Single Thought". Founding member Kilgore created a logo with the motto in Latin (in the spirit of Laurel’s dictum that the organization should have “a half-assed dignity” about it) as Duae tabulae rasae in quibus nihil scriptum est (literally: "Two blank slates on which nothing has been written").

The first public Sons of the Desert meeting was held in New York City in 1965, shortly after Stan Laurel's death. McCabe's group quickly inspired chapters in other United States cities, and then in the United Kingdom and other countries. By 1971, there were 23 chapters.

== In the media ==
The Sons of the Desert organization has been profiled periodically in media outlets, usually in a newsworthy context (as when long-lost films have been discovered). The Saturday Evening Post magazine profiled the organization in 1971 and again in 2020. In 1974 the British Broadcasting Corporation featured the Sons in its documentary film Cuckoo. NBC's whimsical reality show Real People brought the Sons to a national audience in 1980.

The CBN cable-television network scheduled a Laurel & Hardy movie marathon and invited Sons members from across America to take part in the live, national broadcast. A documentary film about the Sons was produced in 1987 by Alexander Marshall: Revenge of the Sons of the Desert is a featurette showing the international membership at one of its conventions, with commentary by celebrity guests. An Emmy Award winner, the film is included in the DVD set The Laurel & Hardy Collection, Volume One (released in 2006).

== International conventions ==
In addition to local and regional meetings, the Sons organization has been holding international conventions every two years. The first conclave was held in Chicago, Illinois (the site of the lodge convention in the original Sons of the Desert film) in 1978. Since then, individual tents in the Sons organization have hosted conventions, typically running four days each and attended by members from around the world. Actors and technicians who worked with Laurel and Hardy have been frequent guests, and rare films and memorabilia are exhibited. Most of the conventions have been located in the United States but some have been held in the United Kingdom and other countries. The next convention will be held in 2026, in San Diego, California.
