= Porter Hanks =

United States Army officer (1785–1812)

- Born: c. 1785; North America
- Died: August 16, 1812 Detroit, Michigan
- Allegiance: United States
- Branch: United States Army
- Service years: 1805–1812
- Rank: Lieutenant
- Conflicts: War of 1812; Siege of Fort Mackinac (surrendered); Siege of Detroit †

Lieutenant Porter Hanks (c. 1785 – August 16, 1812) was a United States Army officer who served in the War of 1812. He is best known for commanding Fort Mackinac, situated on the Strait of Mackinac between Lake Michigan and Lake Huron. Hanks surrendered the fort to British forces on July 17, 1812, in one of the opening engagements of the war.

== Commander ==
Hanks, who joined the army as an artillery lieutenant in 1805, was the commander at Mackinac Island in the spring of 1812. Fort Mackinac was a highly strategic location during the opening weeks of the War of 1812, being the westernmost U.S. military post on the Upper Great Lakes. Its location, however, made communications between the U.S. War Department and the fort difficult. Although the United States had declared war against the British Empire on June 18, 1812, as of mid-July no news of the conflict had been transmitted to northern Michigan.

By contrast across the border in the British post of Fort St. Joseph, Hanks' opposite number had been informed of the outbreak of conflict. Captain Charles Roberts learned on July 8, 1812, that the United States had declared war upon the United Kingdom and, by implication, upon British Canada. Although Roberts' own command numbered scarcely forty men, he was able to recruit approximately 580 First Nations and Native American warriors and fur traders into becoming members of an amphibious assault column. On July 16, a British flotilla made up of one schooner and a fleet of war canoes set sail from Fort St. Joseph to Fort Mackinac. That night, Roberts and his men landed without opposition at Mackinac Island's British Landing, and the small British-Canadian column brought a 6-pound fieldpiece cannon ashore and set it up on a high point that commanded the helpless, uninformed U.S. fort. On the morning of July 17, the British demanded that the Americans surrender their fortification without bloodshed. Hanks, with only 61 men facing the British-Canadian-First Nations force of more than 600, decided to accept the British request.

=== Surrender ===
Hanks had to sign terms of surrender. His men were granted the "honors of war" as they marched out of the surrendered fort, with right of passage off Mackinac Island. Hanks signed these terms even though he knew that he might face a court martial for surrendering his command, and (even behind American lines again) he and his men would be legally barred from active service in an American uniform until distance-exchanged; these pre-prisoner of war conditions were part of what was then a code of honor observed by army officers in the English-speaking world.

Hanks, with his men, was shipped to the American lines at Fort Detroit. Hanks became a paroled prisoner of war, awaiting court martial for his surrender of Fort Mackinac. At Detroit, Hanks reported to the overall theater commander, Gen. William Hull. Hull was reported to have been much disturbed by Hanks' report that the British army was successfully implementing kinship alliances with Native warriors. Soon after Hanks's arrival, another British column attacked Fort Detroit. On the morning of August 16, while Hanks was awaiting a military tribunal, he and an officer standing beside him were killed by the random flight of a British artillery cannonball aimed at the American fort's personnel. The decapitation of Hanks completed the task of discouraging the American general, and later in the same day he surrendered the Detroit strongpoint.
