= John McCabe (writer) =

American Shakespearean scholar and author

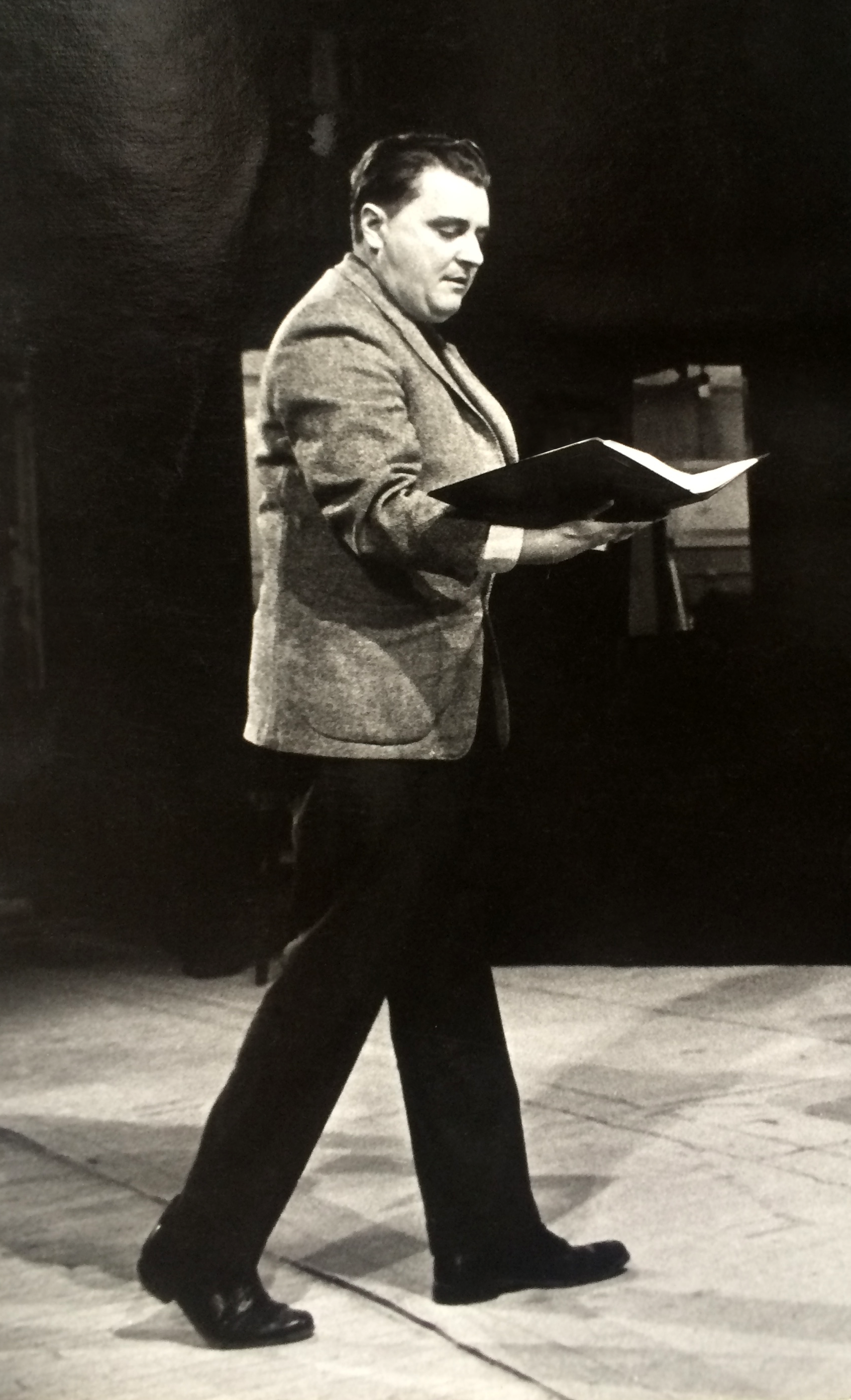
Dr. John McCabe directing a dramatic production at Mackinac College in 1967

John McCabe (November 14, 1920 – September 27, 2005), born John Charles McCabe III, was an American Shakespearean scholar and author, whose first book was the authorized biography of the comedy team known as Laurel and Hardy. This joint biography, as well as his separate books on each man, has been reprinted.

== Early life and education ==
John Charles McCabe III (always called Jack) was born in Detroit, Michigan. His father was an engineer; the son loved acting from an early age, and at seven started to perform professionally with the Jessie Bonstelle Stock Company in the city.

After attending the University of Detroit High School, he served in Europe, from 1943 to 1945, as a sergeant with the United States Army Air Forces. After returning to Detroit, he completed his undergraduate degree at the University of Detroit, graduating in 1947. The following year he was awarded a Master's from Fordham University, after which he began teaching at Wayne University (now Wayne State University) in Detroit. In the 1940s, he was active in the Catholic Theater of Detroit. He earned a Master's in Theatre from Fordham University in New York, and a doctorate from the Shakespeare Institute of the University of Birmingham in England.

== Career ==
Early in his career Dr. McCabe taught acting at Detroit's Wayne State University, City College of New York, Interlochen Arts Academy, and New York University where, as professor of dramatic art, he headed the Educational Theatre Department for many years. He also had a strong interest in popular culture: movies, Broadway plays and musicals, and comedies. His Mr. Laurel and Mr. Hardy first published in 1961, is credited with helping to establish the critical reputation of the 20th-century comedy duo. He also wrote separate books about each man: The Comedy World of Stan Laurel (1974) and Babe: The Life of Oliver Hardy (1989). Having become a show-business biographer, McCabe also wrote George M. Cohan: The Man Who Owned Broadway (1973); Cagney by Cagney (the ghostwritten autobiography of James Cagney, 1976); Cagney (1997); Charlie Chaplin (1978 and 1992); Grand Hotel (1987 and 1993); and Laurel & Hardy [with Al Kilgore & Richard W. Bann] (1984). He also contributed to The Laurel and Hardy Encyclopedia by Glenn Mitchell (1995).

In 1964, Dr. McCabe established the international Laurel and Hardy society, The Sons of the Desert, named after one of the team's films. The founding members were McCabe, actors Orson Bean and Chuck McCann, cartoonist Al Kilgore, and John Municino. After the group had grown to dozens of chapters around the world, McCabe took the title "Exhausted Ruler" (a quotation from the Sons of the Desert film). He told a reporter that he modeled the group on The Baker Street Irregulars, a fan organization for Sherlock Holmes, of which he had been a member. McCabe was one of the chief contributors to the BBC's Omnibus arts strand tribute to the comedy duo, Cuckoo: A Celebration of Mr. Laurel and Mr. Hardy, in 1974. Appearing alongside Dick Van Dyke, Jerry Lewis, Spike Milligan, Hal Roach, Marvin Hatley and Marcel Marceau, McCabe spoke about the Sons of the Desert.

From 1967 to 1970, Dr. McCabe chaired the Department of Drama and Theatre Arts at Mackinac College on Mackinac Island. There he oversaw theater productions by students and staff, their many performances including The Glass Menagerie, John Brown's Body, The Importance of Being Earnest, The Old Lady Shows Her Medals, Everyman, Salad Days, and The Zoo Story. In 1968, John Brown's Body was entered in the Regionals of the American College Theater Festival. When Mackinac College closed in 1970, he taught Speech, Shakespeare, and Drama at Lake Superior State College (now Lake Superior State University) (Sault Ste. Marie)) for 16 years while maintaining his home on Mackinac Island. As a professor, McCabe pushed his students in writing and speech. He and two other professors established the Unicorn Hunters, and annually published a word to be banned from use on campus - one year it was "awesome".

== Marriage and family ==
McCabe married four times, and was widowed three times. He met his first wife, Peggy Richards, while they were both involved in the Catholic Theater of Detroit in the 1940s. They continued with their interest in theatre and together they produced, directed and acted in numerous summer stock productions in Milford, Pennsylvania.

A widower, McCabe married his second wife, Vija Valda Zarina (May 30, 1929 – March 1, 1984), a Latvian-American ballet dancer/choreographer in 1958. "You can have kids," she told him, "or a clean house. But not both." They had three children. When McCabe worked at Mackinac College, Vija taught ballet. She died in 1984, aged 54.

In 1987, Dr. McCabe married Rosina Marchisio, an actress and singer of the 1930s who had played the teacher in the Our Gang films, and was featured in a Laurel & Hardy film, Way Out West. The McCabes divided their time between British Landing, Mackinac Island and New York. She died in 1997 of cancer, age 84.

On April 16, 1998, John McCabe married Karen Lee Jackson. They had known each other since the 1960s, when both worked for Mackinac College. Karen was age 65 when they married. They lived at British Landing on Mackinac Island and she shared his love of both the Island and involvement in theater. She cared for her elderly husband and was with him in Petoskey the night he died. Karen Lee Jackson McCabe died on February 22, 2015, in Petoskey, Michigan.

== Death ==
McCabe died of congestive heart failure at Northern Michigan Hospital in Petoskey. He was survived by his fourth wife, Karen, and his children. He had lived the remainder of his years full-time on Mackinac Island, where he had gone for the summers for 27 years. He was given the title locally of "Shakespearean in Residence" and gave readings annually at the Grand Hotel.

== Bibliography ==
- Mr. Laurel and Mr. Hardy: An Affectionate Biography. Doubleday, 1961; reprint edition, Robson Books, Ltd., 1976; revised edition, New American Library, 1985. ISBN 1-86105-606-0
- The Comedy World of Stan Laurel. Doubleday, 1974; reprint edition, Past Times, 1990. ISBN 1-86105-780-6
- Babe: The Life of Oliver Hardy. Citadel Press, 1990; reprint edition, Robson Books, 2004. ISBN 1-86105-781-4
- Cagney. Alfred A. Knopf, 1997. ISBN 0-679-44607-9

== Sources ==
- Nelson, Valerie J. (September 30, 2005). "John McCabe, 84; Professor Championed Laurel and Hardy", Los Angeles Times; accessed November 9, 2016.
- John McCabe obituary, The Daily Telegraph, October 17, 2005.
