= Siege of Fort Mackinac =

Engagement during the War of 1812

Coordinates: 45.85208°N 84.61747°W

Capture of Fort Mackinac
- Part of the War of 1812
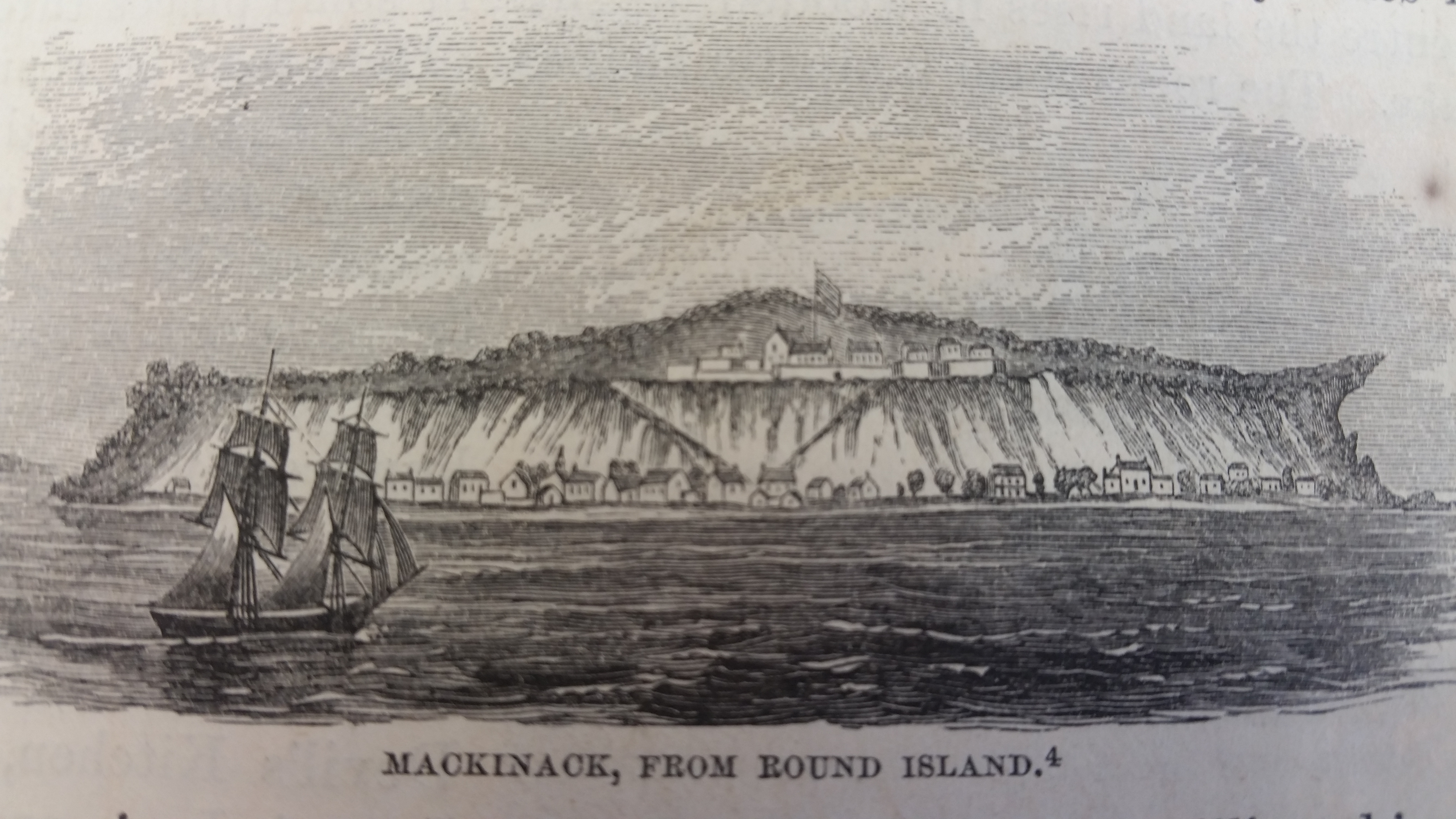
- View of Fort Mackinac from Round Island
Date	17 July 1812
Location	Mackinac Island, Michigan
Result	British-Indigenous victory

Belligerents
United Kingdom; Native Americans	United States

Commanders and leaders
Charles Roberts	Porter Hanks (surrendered)

Strength
About 600	61

Casualties and losses
None	All surrendered

The Capture of Fort Mackinac was one of the first engagements of the War of 1812. A British and Native American force captured the island soon after the outbreak of war between Britain and the United States. Encouraged by the easy British victory, more Native Americans rallied to their support. Their cooperation was an important factor in several British victories during the remainder of the war.

== Background ==
Mackinac Island was a U.S. fur trading post in the Straits of Mackinac between Lake Michigan and Lake Huron. Since the mid-seventeenth century, it had been important for its influence and control over the Native tribes in the area. British and Canadian traders had resented the island being ceded to the United States at the end of the American Revolutionary War. The United States Army maintained a small fort, named Fort Mackinac, on the island.

The fur trade was the most important part of the economy of the large area known as the Northwest. Each spring, large numbers of Native Americans from modern Michigan, Minnesota and Wisconsin gathered at Mackinac or the (Canadian) North West Company's trading post at Sault Sainte Marie about 50 miles (80 km) distant to exchange furs for trade goods. Since the end of the American Revolutionary War, the British Government's policy had been to maintain friendly relations with the Native tribes, and officers of the Indian Department distributed regular presents to them at the British military post at Fort St. Joseph on St. Joseph Island. Many of the Native American tribes from the area were already opposed to the steady western expansion of American settlements and when war came, were eager to join forces with the British and Canadians or mount raids and attacks of their own.

== Outbreak of war ==
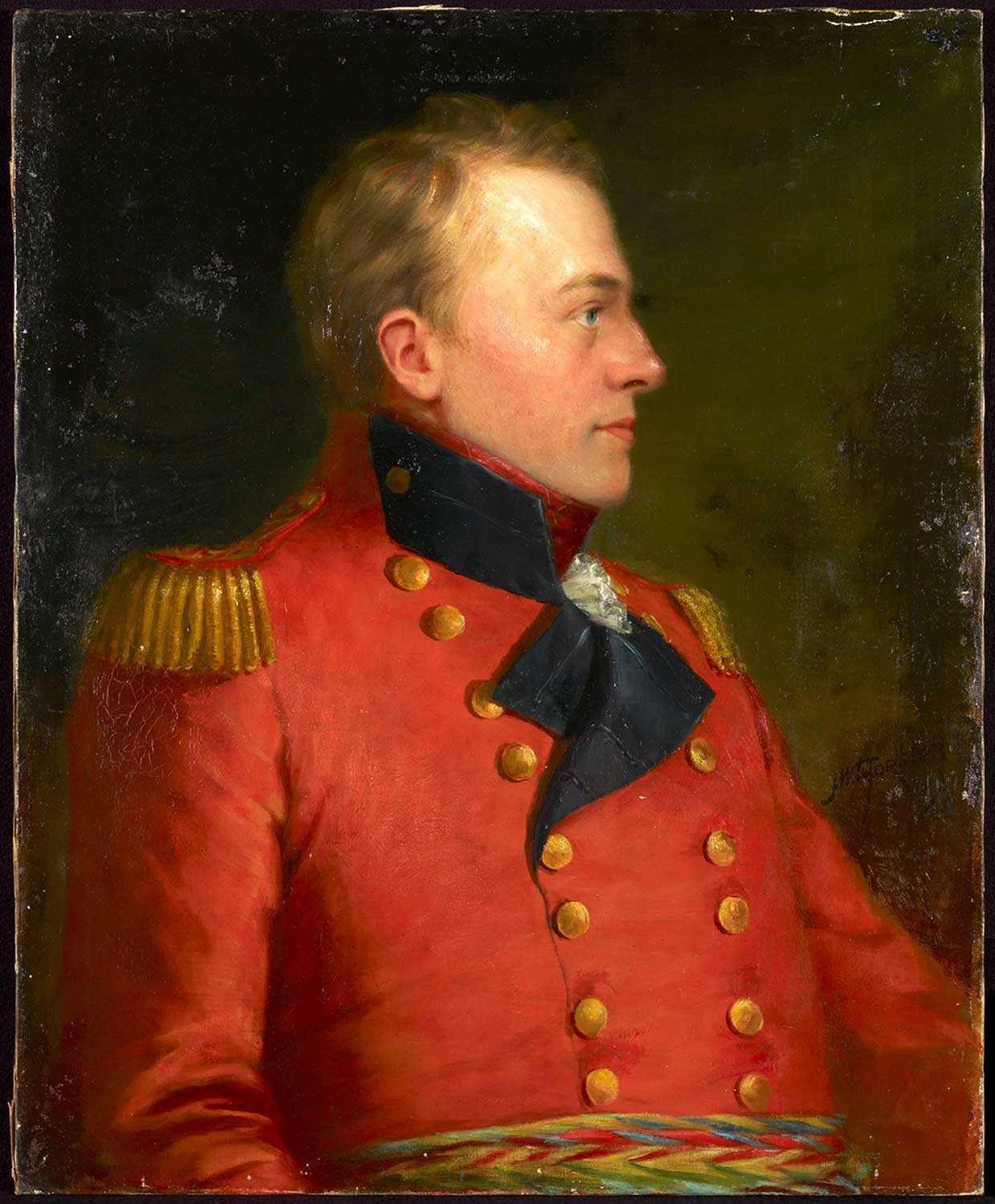
Upon learning of the outbreak of war, Major General Isaac Brock sent a canoe party to inform Captain Charles Roberts of the news, and orders to capture Fort Mackinac.

The British commander in Upper Canada, Major General Isaac Brock, had kept the commander of the post at St. Joseph Island, Captain Charles Roberts, informed of events as war appeared increasingly likely from the start of 1812. As soon as he learned of the outbreak of war, Brock sent a canoe party led by the noted trader William McKay to Roberts with the vital news, and orders to capture Mackinac.

McKay reached St. Joseph Island on 8 July. With the assistance of the North West Company, Roberts immediately began to collect a force consisting of three men of the Royal Artillery, 47 British soldiers of the 10th Royal Veteran Battalion (which Roberts later described as being "debilitated and worn down by unconquerable drunkenness"), 150 Canadian or métis (part-Indian) fur traders and voyageurs, 300 Ojibwa (Chippewa) or Ottawas who were at the island to trade skins, and 110 Sioux, Menominee and Winnebago who had been recruited from present-day Wisconsin by Indian agent Robert Dickson.

As preparations for the expedition proceeded, Roberts received successive orders from Brock to cancel, and then to reinstate, the attack on Mackinac. Colonel Edward Baynes, the Adjutant General for all British forces in Canada, also sent orders for Roberts to concentrate on defending St. Joseph Island. However, on 15 July, Roberts received further orders from Brock which allowed him to use his own discretion. Fearing that the Native American contingents would drift away if they were not allowed to attack, Roberts immediately set out. His force was embarked in the armed schooner Caledonia belonging to the North West Company, seventy war canoes and ten bateaux.

== Capture of Mackinac ==
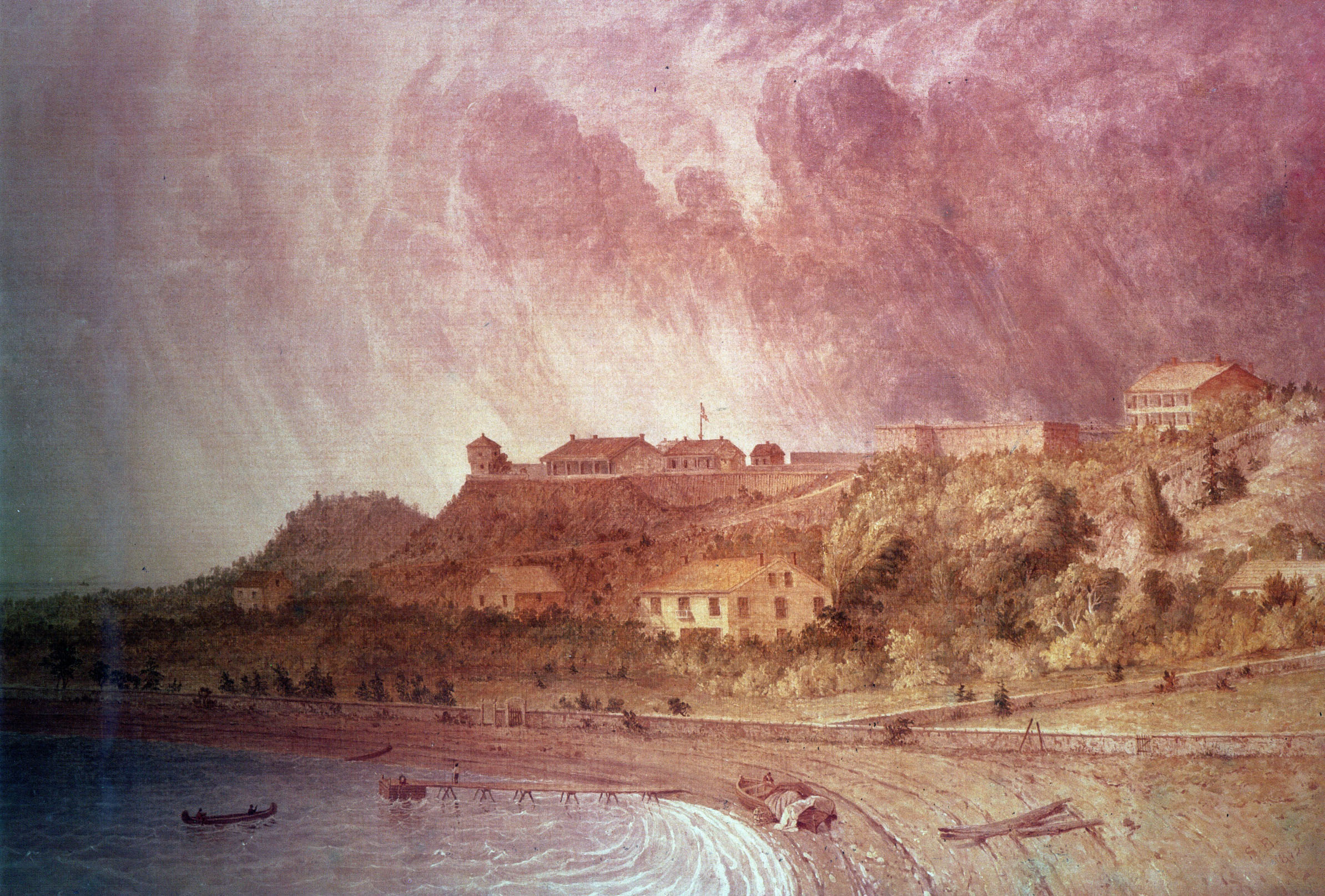
Fort Mackinac, Michigan

Fort Mackinac was a stockaded masonry fort sited on a limestone ridge which overlooked the harbour at the south-eastern end of the island. The American garrison consisted of 61 artillerymen under Lieutenant Porter Hanks with seven guns, although only one of these, a 9-pounder, could reach the harbour. There were other weaknesses; the garrison relied for fresh water on a spring outside the fort, and the position was overlooked by a higher ridge less than a mile away.

The United States Secretary of War William Eustis, who was apparently preoccupied with financial matters, had sent no communications to Hanks for several months. He sent word of the declaration of war on 18 June to the commanders in the northwest by ordinary rate post. The Postmaster at Cleveland, Ohio realised the importance of the news and hired an express rider to take it to Brigadier General William Hull, who was advancing on Detroit, but it was too late to save both Hull and Hanks from being taken by surprise by the outbreak of hostilities.

Though he was unaware of events elsewhere, Hanks had heard rumours of unusual activity at St. Joseph Island. He sent a fur trader named Michael Dousman, who held a commission as an officer in the militia, to investigate. Dousman's boat was captured by the advancing British force, and Dousman apparently quickly changed sides.

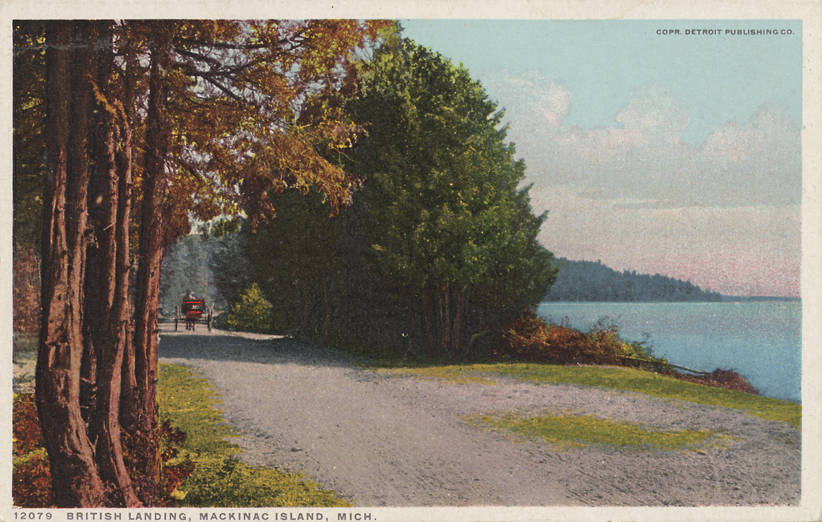
View of British Landing, c. 1898. British forces landed near the settlement on the night of July 16.

Having learned from Dousman that the Americans at Mackinac were unaware of the outbreak of war, Roberts's force landed at a settlement later named British Landing on the north end of the island, 2 miles (3.2 km) away from the fort, early on the morning of 17 July. They quietly removed the village's inhabitants from their homes, dragged a 6-pounder cannon through the woods to a ridge above the fort and fired a single round before sending a message under a flag of truce, demanding the surrender of the fort.

Hanks's force was surprised and was already at a tactical disadvantage. The flag of truce had been accompanied by three of the villagers, who greatly exaggerated the number of Natives in Roberts's force. Fearing a massacre by the Natives, Hanks capitulated without a fight. The garrison of the fort was taken prisoner, but was released on giving their parole not to fight for the remainder of the war.

== Aftermath ==
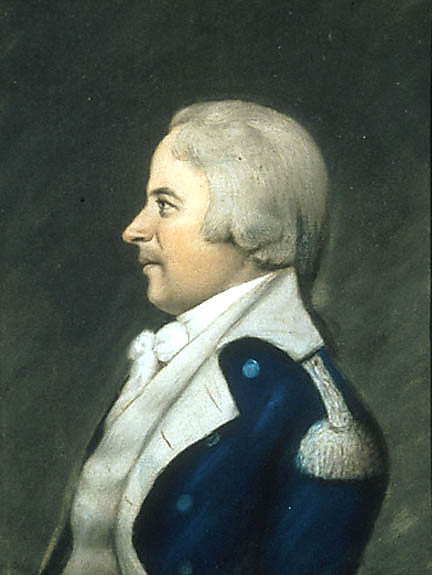
American Brig Gen William Hull abandoned his invasion of Upper Canada and garrisoned at Fort Detroit on August 3, upon learning that the British captured Mackinac.

The island's inhabitants were given a choice to swear an oath of allegiance to the United Kingdom or leave within a month; most took the oath. Roberts arrested three deserters from the British Army and twenty alleged British citizens. There was no looting, although Roberts expropriated the goods in the United States storehouses and a government trading post and purchased several bullocks to feed the Natives. The British abandoned their own fort at St. Joseph Island and concentrated their forces at Mackinac Island.

Of the Natives present, the Ottawa contingent had apparently remained aloof from the others. They and most of the Chippewas later dispersed. At least some of the "Western Indians" (those recruited from Wisconsin and other territories to the west) proceeded south to join the warriors with Tecumseh at Fort Amherstburg. The mere threat of their arrival prompted the American Brigadier General Hull to abandon his invasion of Canadian territory and retreat to Detroit on 3 August. The news of the loss of Mackinac also prompted several Native communities such as the Wyandots near Detroit, who had been friendly to the Americans or neutral, to rally to the British cause. Their hostility influenced the U.S. surrender at the Siege of Detroit shortly afterwards. Lieutenant Hanks was killed by a cannon shot at Detroit shortly before the surrender, while awaiting a court martial for cowardice.

British control of Fort Mackinac and northern Michigan was not seriously challenged until 1814 when a large American force was dispatched to retake control of the area. However, the American force was defeated in the Battle of Mackinac Island and the Engagements on Lake Huron.

== Bibliography ==
- Dunnigan, Brian Leigh. A picturesque situation Mackinac before photography, 1615-1860. Wayne State University Press, 2008.
- Elting, John R. (1995). Amateurs to Arms. New York: Da Capo Press. ISBN 0-306-80653-3.
- Hitsman, J. Mackay; Graves, Donald E. (1999). The Incredible War of 1812. Toronto: Robin Brass Studio. ISBN 1-896941-13-3.
- McCoy, Raymond. The massacre of old Fort Mackinac (Michilimackinac) a tragedy of the American frontier, with the early history of St. Ignace, Mackinaw city and Mackinac island ..1946.
- Stacey, C. P. (1964). "The Defence of Upper Canada". In Zaslow, Morris (ed.). The Defended Border: Upper Canada and the War of 1812. Macmillan of Canada. OCLC 480289.
- Wood, Edwin (1918). Historic Mackinac; the historical, picturesque and legendary features of the Mackinac country; illustrated from sketches, drawings, maps and photographs, with an original map of Mackinac Island, made especially for this work.
