= Royal Veteran Battalions =

British Army unit type, 1802–1826

Royal Veteran Battalions were British Army units of the early nineteenth century that were made up of men no longer fit for front-line service. They had been previously termed "invalid battalions" but this was deemed derogatory and changed.

== History ==
Between 1802 and 1820, 13 Royal Garrison Battalions, renamed Royal Veteran Battalions in 1804, were raised, taking into service army pensioners and invalids. Generally, these battalions worked in depots and stores doing administration and support work, which enabled the more able-bodied soldiers to do the fighting. These veteran battalions were disbanded and re-formed up until the 1820s.

Most of the original battalions were disbanded in 1814, but the 10th (in Canada) and the 13th (in Portugal) were not disbanded until 1815. The 6th bore the additional title Royal North British. The 13th was authorised to bear the battle honour "Peninsula".

A second group of eight battalions was formed in June 1815, and disbanded the following year. A third group of ten was formed in 1819 and disbanded in 1821. A fourth group of three battalions was formed in 1821, all in Ireland, and disbanded in 1826.

There was also a veteran battalion of the King's German Legion.

== Veteran battalions ==
=== 1st Royal Veteran Battalion ===
The 1st Royal Veteran Battalion served in Portsmouth, Gibraltar, Holland, Landguard Fort, and Harwich, where they were disbanded in 1814. Reformed the following year in Plymouth, they were disbanded in 1816 at Plymouth.

=== 2nd Royal Veteran Battalion ===
The 2nd Royal Veteran Battalion was first formed in 1802 at Plymouth and was disbanded and re-formed eight times in different parts of the country. In 1806, a detachment was sent to the New South Wales Corps. The 2nd battalion served in Plymouth, Heligoland, and Madeira (1809–1814). In January 1815, 9 companies were disbanded at London; but in June, 4 companies of the 8th Royal Veteran Battalion at Heligoland were ordered to form the nucleus of a new 2nd battalion, which was disbanded in 1816 at Harwich.

In 1819, the 2nd battalion was re-formed at Portsmouth from fit out-pensioners to curb political unrest. It served at Waterford in 1820 and was disbanded in 1821 at Gosport. It was raised again in 1821 at Newry, served in Londonderry in 1822, and was disbanded in 1826 at Enniskillen.

=== 3rd Royal Veteran Battalion ===
The 3rd Royal Veteran Battalion was raised on Jersey and served there before being disbanded in 1814 at Chelsea. In 1815, 2 companies of both the 6th and 9th Royal Veteran Battalions were used to form a new 3rd battalion at Edinburgh, where it was disbanded a year later.

=== 4th Royal Veteran Battalion ===
The 4th Royal Veteran Battalion was raised in Ireland and served there and in Gibraltar. In 1806, a detachment of 36 men was posted to the New South Wales Corps; and in 1808, 200 unfit men were transferred to the new 12th Royal Veteran Battalion. In 1814, after returning from Gibraltar, the 4th battalion was disbanded at Deptford. In 1815, the 10th Royal Veteran Battalion was renumbered as the 4th battalion, with many of its members settling in Canada c.1817, following its disbandment.

=== 5th Royal Veteran Battalion ===
The 5th Royal Veteran Battalion was raised and served in Guernsey and on Alderney. It disbanded in 1814 at Chelsea. The battalion was later reformed with 3 companies of the 11th Royal Veteran Battalion before being disbanded in 1816 at Deptford.

=== 6th Royal Garrison Battalion ===
The 6th, or Royal North British, Garrison Battalion was raised for the first time in Scotland, in December 1802, and eight companies, of ten, were disbanded in 1814 at Fort George, with two companies amalgamating with two companies of the 9th Royal Veteran Battalion to form the new 3rd Royal Veteran Battalion.

In 1815, the 6th battalion was re-raised in Ireland, using officers and men from the 12th Royal Veteran Battalion disbanded at Cork the previous year. The 6th battalion was re-formed in 1819 at Edinburgh from fit out-pensioners, to curb political unrest, and was disbanded in 1821 at Edinburgh.

=== 7th Royal Veteran Battalion ===
The 7th Royal Veteran Battalion was formed, originally in 1802, at Fulham as a garrison battalion, becoming "veteran" in December 1804, based at the Tower of London. In 1807, 500 men were transferred to form the new 11th Royal Veteran Battalion. The 7th battalion was disbanded in 1814 at Chelsea.

=== 8th Royal Veteran Battalion ===
The 8th Royal Veteran Battalion was raised in 1804 at Fulham and served at Cumberland Fort and on Heligoland. It included officers from the New South Wales Corps who returned to England in 1810. In 1815, 4 companies transferred to the new 2nd Royal Veteran Battalion and the 8th battalion disbanded. A new 8th battalion was formed from fit out-pensioners at Chelsea Hospital. It served on Jersey and disbanded in 1816 at Portsmouth.

=== 9th Royal Veteran Battalion ===
The 9th Royal Veteran Battalion formed at Edinburgh in April 1805, serving at Edinburgh Castle and, later, a company each on the Orkney and the Shetland Isles. Eight companies were disbanded in 1814, and the remaining two companies on the Isles were merged into the 3rd Royal Veteran Battalion in 1815.

=== 10th Royal Veteran Battalion ===
The 10th Royal Veteran Battalion was established in December 1806 on the Isle of Wight from volunteers of other veteran battalions for service in Canada. Those volunteering were promised land in Canada upon their retirement or the battalion's disbandment. When war broke out, the 10th was among the first into action; the detachment at Fort St. Joseph under Captain Charles Roberts taking part in the Capture of Fort Mackinac. In April 1813, a corps of seventeen "Mounted Veterans" was formed, presumably for maintaining communications between the various posts around Montreal. In 1815, the battalion was renumbered as the 4th Royal Veteran Battalion; it was disbanded in 1816. On 10 November 1816, the ship transporting the families returning to England was wrecked and 143 drowned.

=== 11th Royal Veteran Battalion ===
The 11th Royal Veteran Battalion was formed in 1807 from 5 companies of the 7th Royal Veteran Battalion. They served in Guernsey, Bexhill, Winchelsea, the Isle of Man, and Hythe. Four companies were disbanded at Hythe; and in 1814, three companies, from Anholt, were disbanded at Chelsea. The remaining three companies in the Isle of Man transferred to the new 5th Royal Veteran Battalion in 1815. The 11th battalion was briefly reformed and was finally disbanded in 1816 at Deptford.

=== 12th Royal Veteran Battalion ===
The 12th Royal Veteran Battalion was formed at Cork from 200 men of the 4th Royal Veteran Battalion who were unfit for foreign service. The battalion served in Ireland until disbandment in 1814.

=== 13th Royal Veteran Battalion ===
The 13th Royal Veteran Battalion was raised in 1813 at Lisbon from Peninsula War invalids. It served in 1815 in Ostend, returned to Sheerness, and was renumbered on disbandment of other veteran battalions to become the 7th Royal Veteran Battalion. The battalion was disbanded in 1816 at Chelsea.

=== Veteran Battalion of the King's German Legion ===
On 26 January 1813 approval was announced for the formation of a veteran battalion "to receive the worn-out men of the Kings German Legion". The personnel were to be drawn from across the Legion. A memorandum of 8 February states that the battalion would incorporate the personnel of the Independent Garrison Company of the King's German Legion, then serving in Portugal. The Veteran Battalion was formed at Bexhill from 25 February, and was initially of four companies. In January 1814, it was augmented to six companies, and in August 1815, to ten.

== Regimental colonels ==
- 1st RVB: 25 December 1802, William Edmeston; 30 June 1804, James Stewart; 1819, Colonel Archibald Christie, late of the 12th RVB
- 2nd RVB: 25 December 1802, David Home; 22 February 1810, Anthony Lewis Layard; 1815, John Watson Tadwell Watson; 1819, Major General William Douglas, from half-pay, 97th Foot
- 3rd RVB: 25 December 1802, James Lumsdaine; 14 May 1807, William Maxwell; 1815, Sir Paulus Æmilius Irving, Bt
- 4th RVB: 25 December 1802, Grice Blakeney
- 5th RVB: 25 December 1802, Charles Horneck; 16 April 1804, Hon. Francis Needham; 25 June 1810, John Manners Kerr
- 6th RVB: 25 December 1802, Sir Paulus Æmilius Irving, Bt.
- 7th RVB: 25 December 1802, Thomas Murray;
- 8th RVB: 1 January 1805, John Watson Tadwell Watson; 15 June 1815, Alexander Mair
- 9th RVB: 21 March 1805, Colin Mackenzie
- 10th RVB: 25 December 1806, Lowther Pennington, Lord Muncaster; 18 November 1813, Donald Macpherson
- 11th RVB: 25 April 1807, Andrew John Drummond
- 12th RVB: 25 June 1808, John Despard; 31 August 1809, George Benson
- 13th RVB: 19 November 1812, William Raymond

== Additional sources ==
- Lawson, C.C.P., 'A History of the Uniforms of the British Army' Volume 5 (London, Kaye & Ward, 1967) White, A.S.,
- 'Garrison, reserve and veteran battalions and companies', in: Journal of the Society for Army Historical Research, 38 (1960), pp. 156–67
