= British Landing =

- U.S. National Historic Landmark District – Contributing property
- Michigan State Historic Site
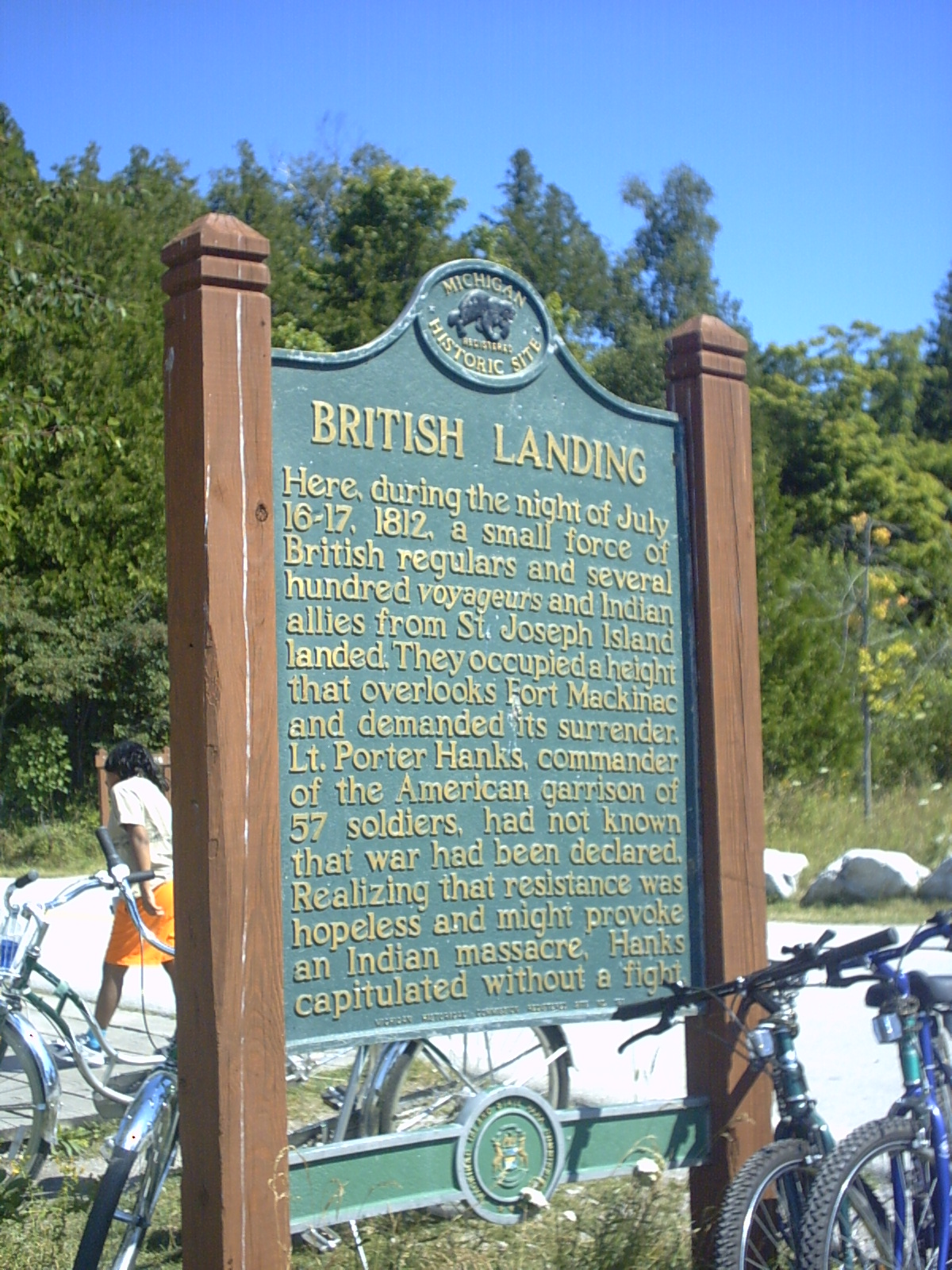

- Location within Michigan Location within the United States
- Location: Mackinac Island, Michigan
- Coordinates: 45°52′39″N 84°38′42″W
- Part of: Mackinac Island (ID66000397)

Significant dates
- Designated NHLDCP: October 15, 1966
- Designated MSHS: July 19, 1956

British Landing is a place within Mackinac Island, Michigan and is located on the shore of Mackinac Island, two miles (3 km) northwest of the island's downtown and harbor. British Landing is the site of a War of 1812 amphibious operation on July 16–17, 1812, by a joint force of the British Army and their allies among the Native Americans and indigenous people of Canada. The operation led directly to the surrender of Fort Mackinac by the U.S. Army.

== History ==
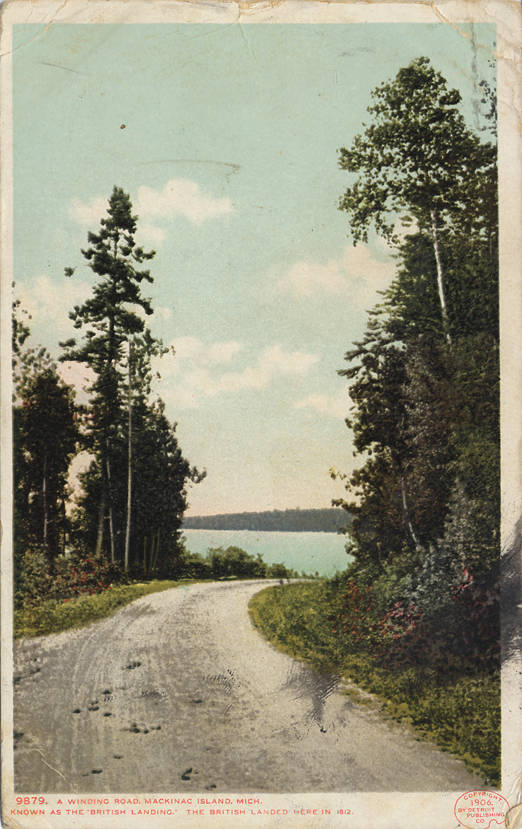
Lake Shore Road approaching British Landing, 1906.

As the war began, Fort Mackinac, located at the northwestern end of Lake Huron, was a strategic strongpoint that dominated the Upper Great Lakes. Adjacent to the fort, a trading post for furs was a key supply point for Euro-American-Native American commerce and exchange.

While poor American military intelligence failed to communicate to Fort Mackinac the news that war had broken out, the British military command in Upper Canada was not idle. They promptly notified the commander of Fort St. Joseph, a British strongpoint located approximately 40 miles (65 km) northeast by canoe. Ft. St. Joseph's British commander, Charles Roberts, determined to recruit Native allies and assault Mackinac Island.

With a single sailing vessel and a flotilla of war canoes, the expeditionary force arrived on the north shore of Mackinac Island on the night of July 16–17, 1812. Full secrecy was maintained and the warriors landed without detection by the American army.

The sailing vessel had brought one or more light cannon, which were wrestled ashore at British Landing and hauled up through the interior of the Island to a location above Fort Mackinac. On the morning of July 17, the British and Natives displayed their troops and cannon surrounding the fort, and demanded its surrender. The operation was completely successful. Fort Mackinac fell to the British without a single casualty.

Two years later, on August 4, 1814, as the War of 1812 moved towards its conclusion, an American expeditionary force landed here at British Landing in an attempt to recapture Fort Mackinac from the British. Unlike the British landing of 1812, the American landing of 1814 was not a surprise and was not successful. The 1814 amphibious operation was a failure and the American detachment was forced to re-embark on the same day.

== Recent years ==
British Landing is now an important intersection on M-185 (Lake Shore Road), the state highway that serves as a non-motorized road and bicycle pathway around the shore of Mackinac Island. Like the rest of Mackinac Island, M-185 is not open to motor vehicles. During the summer months, British Landing is frequented by visitors who have arrived by bicycle or horse-drawn carriage.

British Landing was for many years the home of noted Shakespearean and drama scholar John McCabe.

Much of the land in the British Landing area is located in Mackinac Island State Park.

== Registered historic site ==
In 1958, British Landing was added to the list of registered Michigan historic sites as Registered Site SO187. A historic marker was erected.
