= Charles Roberts (soldier, died 1816) =

British Army captain in the War of 1812

- Born: c. 1772
- Died: 4 May 1816
- Military career
- Allegiance: United Kingdom
- Branch: British Army
- Rank: Captain

Charles Roberts (c. 1772 – 4 May 1816) was a captain in the British Army during the War of 1812. He is best known for his field command of the mixed British-Canadian-First Nations column that captured a United States strongpoint, Fort Mackinac, on 17 July 1812 in one of the opening movements of the war.

== Biography ==
=== West Indies and Canada ===
Until 1812, Roberts' record had been that of a low-ranking British officer. After being awarded a commission as an ensign in 1795, he served for approximately eleven years in British posts in the Caribbean Sea, particularly on the island of Trinidad. He was promoted to captain in 1801. Roberts' health declined sharply in the mid-1800s. The West Indies, then subject to frequent attacks of malaria and yellow fever, were not seen as a suitable post for a career officer with health concerns. The British Army had organized several battalions of "veterans" for career soldiers in equivocal health, and Roberts succeeded in transferring his commission. His new unit, the 10th Royal Veteran Battalion, arrived in Canada in 1807 for service in what was then a comparatively peaceful wing of the British Empire, far away from the Napoleonic Wars.

As an army captain, Roberts was eligible for a low-ranking independent command. Despite continued complaints of ill health, he was slated in 1811 to take command at Fort St. Joseph, a border garrison and frontier fur-trading post located on St. Joseph Island in northern Lake Huron. Captain Roberts promptly reported to his superiors that his new 46-man command was struggling with alcoholism or as he called it, "unconquerable drunkenness." Fort St. Joseph proved to be ill-supplied by the British army and dependent for its sustenance on private and semi-private fur traders who, with licenses from British Canadian authorities, maintained ties with friendly First Nations people and worked with their Native kinfolk to sustain the upper Great Lakes economy. In November 1811 Captain Roberts even had to beg the post's resident fur trader, John Askin Jr., for point blankets in order to sew winter clothing for his garrison.

=== War of 1812 ===
It was at this post, garrisoned with less than fifty men, that Captain Roberts learned on 8 July 1812 that the United States had declared war upon the United Kingdom and, by implication, upon British Canada. The aging and debilitated junior officer responded with surprising swiftness, organizing his blanket-cloaked men into a rapid-response force aimed at a rival United States strongpoint at Mackinac Island. Askin, Robert Dickson, and First Nations war band leaders organized approximately 580 warriors and fur traders into a component of Roberts' Lake Huron striking force. On 16 July, a British flotilla made up of the schooner Caledonia and a fleet of war canoes and Bateaux set sail from Fort St. Joseph to Fort Mackinac. That night, Roberts and his men landed without opposition at Mackinac Island's British Landing, and the small British-Canadian column brought a 6-pound fieldpiece cannon ashore and set it up on a high point that commanded the helpless, uninformed U.S. fort. On the morning of 17 July, the British demanded that the Americans surrender their fortification without bloodshed. The American commander Porter Hanks, with only 61 men facing the British-Canadian-First Nations force of more than 600, decided to accept the British request.

Captain Roberts, as the victorious commander, had the right to write out terms of surrender. He granted the "honors of war" to the humiliated American garrison, and the right of passage off Mackinac Island within 30 days to the U.S. troops and to any Island civilians who did not care to take an oath of allegiance to the United Kingdom. As Fort Mackinac's new commander, Captain Roberts worked to reorganize his scratch force of fur-trading militiamen into a disciplined auxiliary unit, the Michigan Fencibles. He commanded the Fort during the winter of 1812-1813; his men continued to wear their blanket coats, which were renamed Mackinaw jackets in honor of their successful action. However, during this winter Roberts' health further deteriorated. Complaining of a "great debility of the Stomach and Bowels," the commander requested leave in May 1813. In September 1813 a replacement officer, Richard Bullock, arrived and Roberts was ordered to return to headquarters in Quebec.

=== Retirement ===
Fort Mackinac proved to be Captain Charles Roberts' last command. As his health continued to deteriorate he requested an Army promotion, various appointments, and then a pensioned retirement on military disability. The captain was not decorated or honored in any way for his daring 1812 command operation, and Quebec headquarters (which was actively engaged in continued combat with the American army until early 1815) ignored the shelved officer. Finally in 1815, with the return of peacetime traffic across the Atlantic, he was granted six months' leave and told to board a ship going east. Back in London, Roberts continued his solicitations and was granted his long-sought disability status. He did not enjoy it long, dying in the British capital in May 1816. Later Canadian historians have classified Roberts as an unacknowledged hero in the defense of their country in 1812.
