= Fort St. Joseph (Ontario) =

Historic site in Ontario, Canada

Coordinates: 46°03′48″N 83°56′48″W

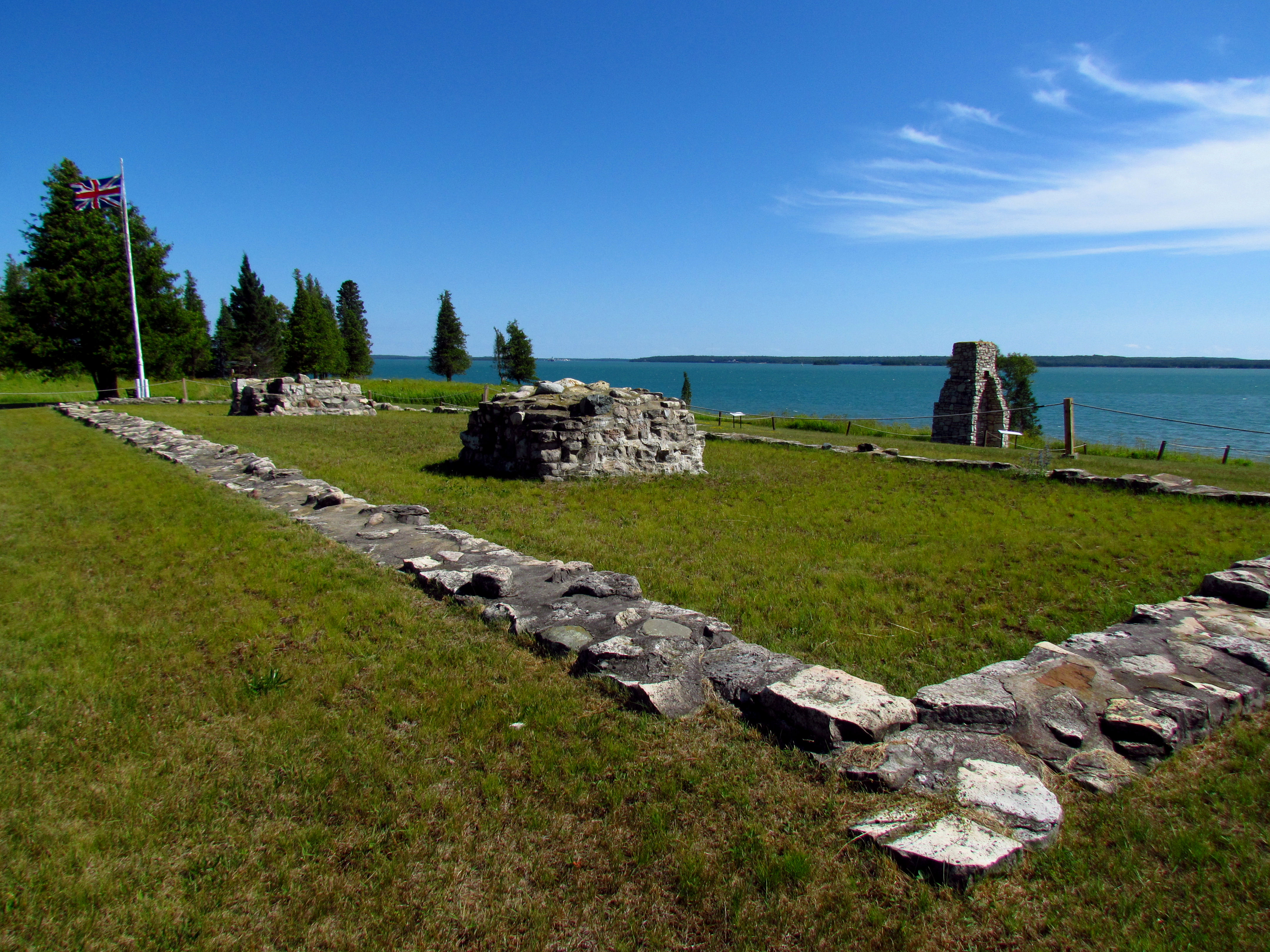
- Established: 1796
- Location: Jocelyn, Ontario, Canada, on Lake Huron
- Type: Fort
- Website: www.pc.gc.ca/lhn-nhs/en/stjoseph/

National Historic Site of Canada
- Designated: 1923

Fort St. Joseph is a former British outpost on the southernmost point of St. Joseph Island in Ontario, Canada, on Lake Huron. The fort consisted of a blockhouse, powder magazine, bakery building, Indian council house and storehouse surrounded by a palisade.

Situated on approximately 325 hectares along the St. Marys River, Fort St. Joseph was the staging ground for the initial attack in the War of 1812. The fort was an important regional military outpost and a significant meeting place for trade and commerce in the region. During its short but significant occupation, it was the most westerly British outpost in North America. Today, Fort St. Joseph is operated by Parks Canada and is designated a National Historic Site of Canada.

== History ==
In 1783, the Treaty of Paris was signed and the newly formed United States was awarded Michilimackinac, a trading post on Mackinac Island where Lakes Huron and Michigan connect. The strategic position of Michilimackinac gave the Americans sound control of the upper Great Lakes. Forced into making an urgent decision, Lord Dorchester, then Military Governor of Canada, advised that St. Joseph Island be occupied quickly, fearing that the Americans might lay claim to the island. Lord Dorchester had hoped to compete with and possibly replace Michilimackinac as the hub of the fur trade in the region while keeping Aboriginal allegiance.

The situation was clarified by Jay's Treaty. It came into effect in 1796 and finally compelled the withdrawal of British forces from frontier forts which were awarded to the Americans under the treaty. This led to the establishment of a number of new British forts, to replace the ones that were relinquished. Fort Mackinac was one of these relinquishments, with the British constructing Fort St. Joseph as a replacement.

In the summer of 1796, construction of Fort St. Joseph began.

Strained relations between British and Americans became apparent in 1807 because of the foreign and trade policies of the two countries. Control over the Great Lakes and fur trade was also a factor in these strained relations. Fort St. Joseph, as yet unfinished, was undermanned and contained out of date weapons so it was exceedingly apparent that Fort St. Joseph would be unequipped and incapable in defending itself amid attack.

=== War of 1812 ===
The Congress of United States declared war on Great Britain on 18 June 1812. Appreciating the significance of Fort St. Joseph, Major-General Sir Isaac Brock, military commander of Upper Canada, sent a message to Captain Charles Roberts, commander of Fort St. Joseph, ordering to prepare for immediate attack on Michilimackinac. On 16 July 1812, Captain Roberts and an army of British soldiers (a detachment of the 10th Royal Veteran Battalion), French Canadian voyageurs (most of them from nearby Sault Ste. Marie), and about four hundred Ottawa, Ojibwa, Menominee, and Winnebago warriors set off on a flotilla towards Fort Michilimackinac. The mission was accomplished without major incident and the task force landed at British Landing on Mackinac Island on the morning of 17 July 1812. Lieutenant Porter Hanks, commander of Fort Michilimackinac, was unprepared for an attack and Fort Michilimackinac was severely under-manned. Before Lieutenant Hanks' men could act, Captain Roberts's army had already taken position and Hanks had no choice but to surrender.

Meanwhile, Americans from Detroit arrived at Fort St. Joseph to find it deserted and they burned the fort and the North West Company storehouses that were present there.

Until the end of the war, it was indisputable that Michilimackinac was British, but when the peace treaty was signed in December 1814, Michilimackinac was restored to the Americans and the British decided not to rebuild Fort St. Joseph. The British then built a fort on Drummond Island between St. Joseph and Mackinaw, but maintained the use of the powder magazine at the otherwise abandoned Fort St. Joseph. Fort St. Joseph was then forgotten when the British moved the garrison to Penetanguishene after the decline of the fur trade.

== Today ==
Until the early 1920s, no one had undertaken a serious interest in the forgotten fort. At that time, the Sault Ste. Marie Historical Society began to explore the ruins. It wasn't until shortly after World War II that a road was built to the site and a small picnic area established.

The University of Toronto showed interest in the site in the late 1950s, and teams began archaeological digs in the summers of 1963 and 1964. It was not until 1974 that Parks Canada assumed control of the site and a visitor centre was built.

Today, archaeological digs occur occasionally and many new artifacts are discovered with each new excavation. The park attracts a few thousand visitors annually.

== See also ==
- Chronology of the War of 1812
- War of 1812 Campaigns
- List of forts
- Upper Canada
- Fort Mackinac
- Islands of the Great Lakes
- Sault Ste. Marie, Ontario

== Affiliations ==
The Museum is affiliated with: CMA, CHIN, and Virtual Museum of Canada.
