= Greatcoat =

Large heavy overcoat

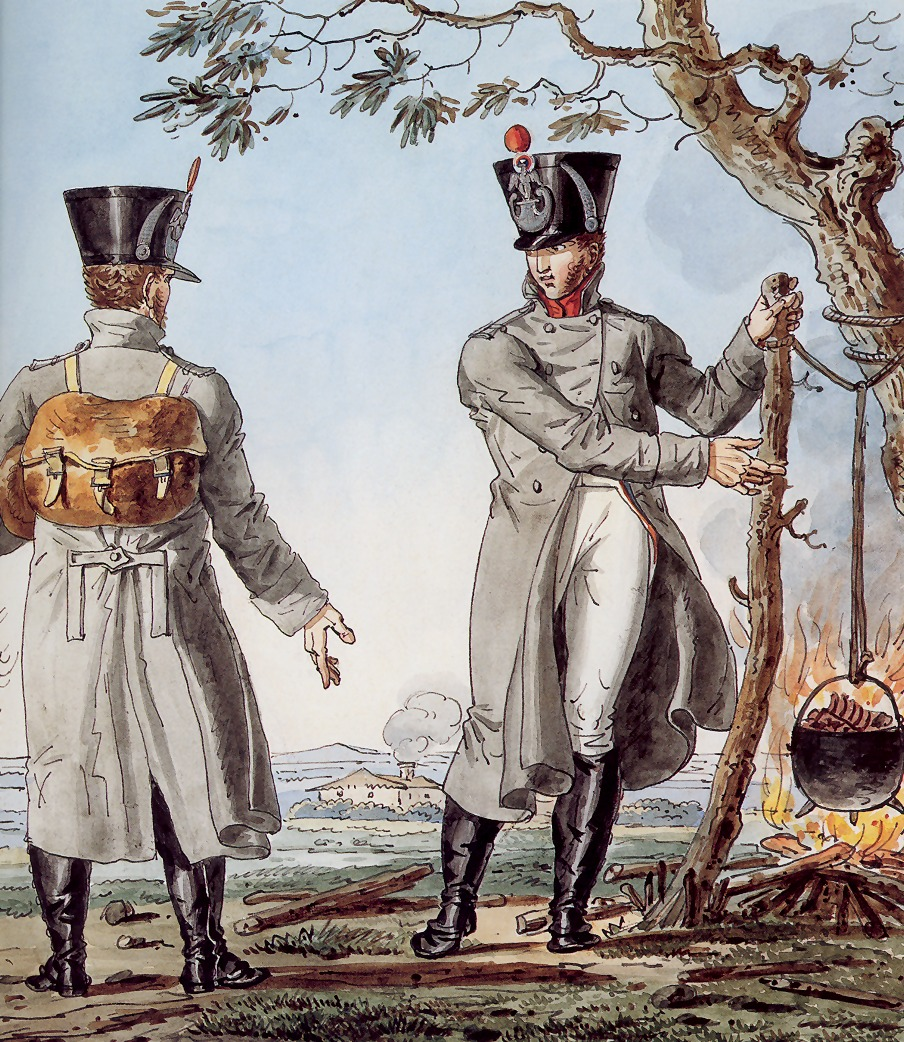
Two light-infantry officers of the French Imperial Army wearing greatcoats (1812 illustration by Carle Vernet)

A greatcoat (also watchcoat) is a large, woollen overcoat designed for warmth and for protection against wind and weather. It features a collar that can be turned up and cuffs that can be turned down to protect the face and the hands, while the short rain-cape at the shoulders protects from wind and repels rain. In the 19th century, such a coat was part of a soldier's military uniform, to be worn while on watch (guard duty), hence the term watchcoat.

The drape of the greatcoat reaches to below the knee of the wearer, the short cape drapes reach to the elbow, and the capacious external pockets allow the wearer to carry dry food and other items; for example in the Petersham coat, named after Viscount Petersham. In the fashion of the Regency era (1795–1837) a greatcoat might feature several short capes, usually designed, cut, and tailored to the specifications of fit and to the aesthetic taste of a dandy.

Russian and Soviet armed forces used various greatcoats (Russian: шинели; singular: шинель, shinel') as part of standard uniforms from the mid-1760s until the late-1990s. Soviet general officers in World War II, for example, could wear a light-grey dress greatcoat.

== Popular culture ==
- The Doctor Who television series featured many greatcoats:
  - Patrick Troughton wore one when playing the Second Doctor in the episode The War Games.
  - Matt Smith wore an army green greatcoat when playing the Eleventh Doctor in the episodes Let's Kill Hitler, The Girl Who Waited, Closing Time, and The Wedding of River Song.
  - Jack Harkness wore a navy-blue greatcoat in the series and in Torchwood.

== Gallery ==
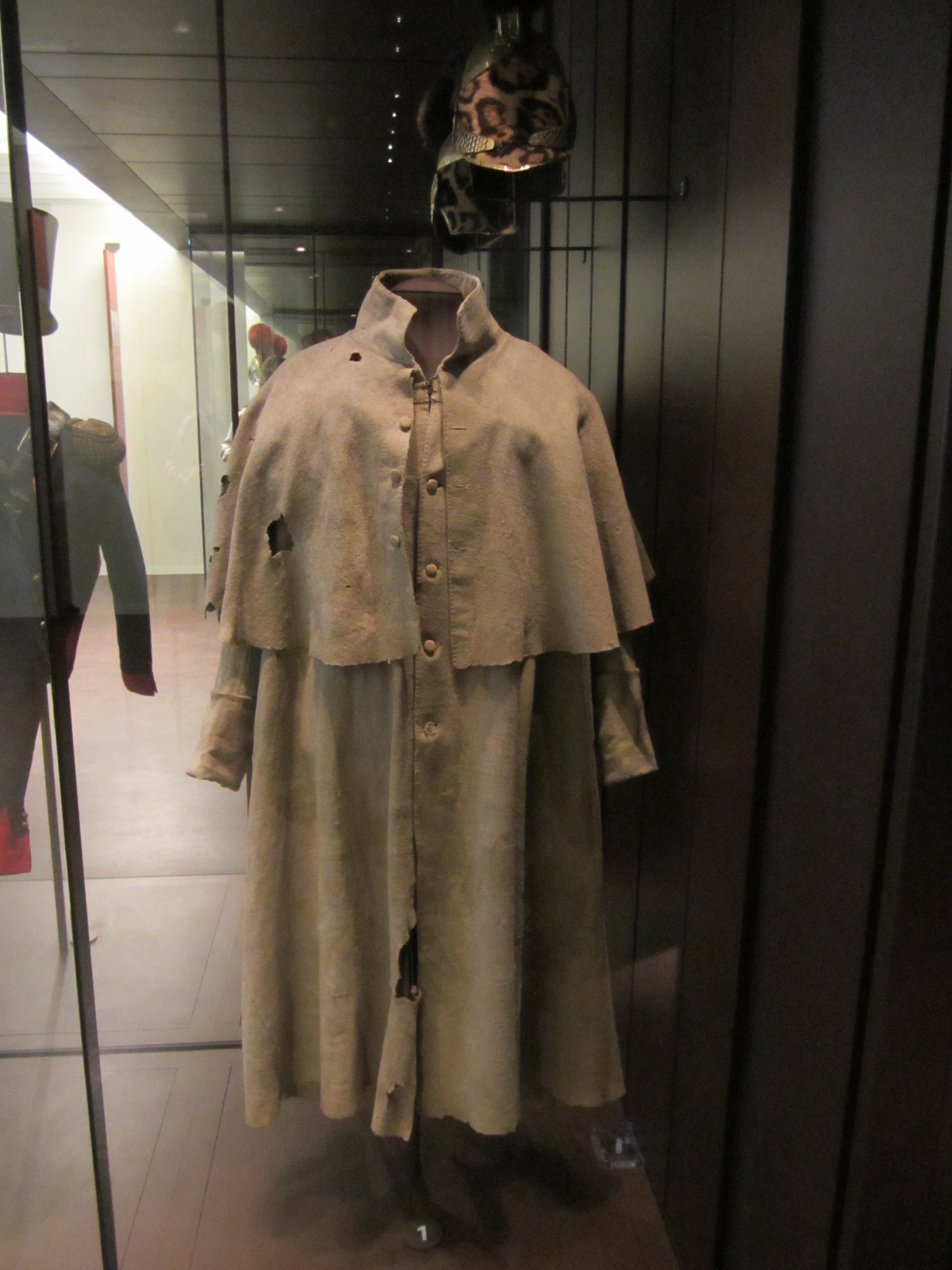
The greatcoat of a French dragoon worn in 1812

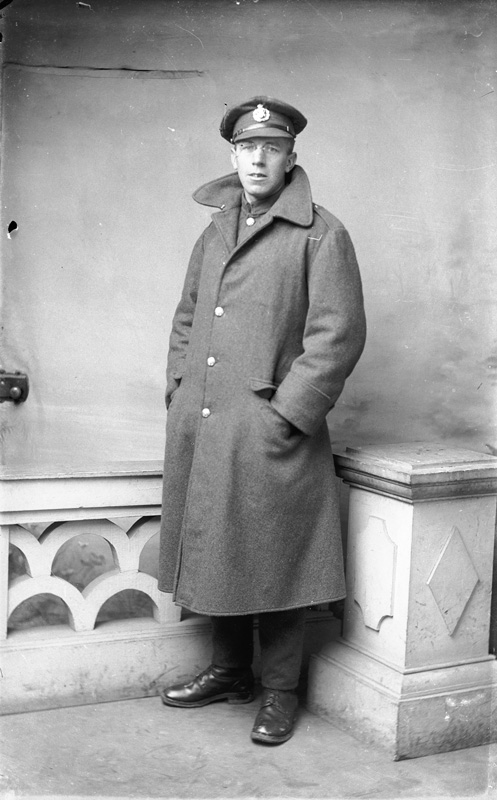
A British soldier wearing his army-issue greatcoat during World War I

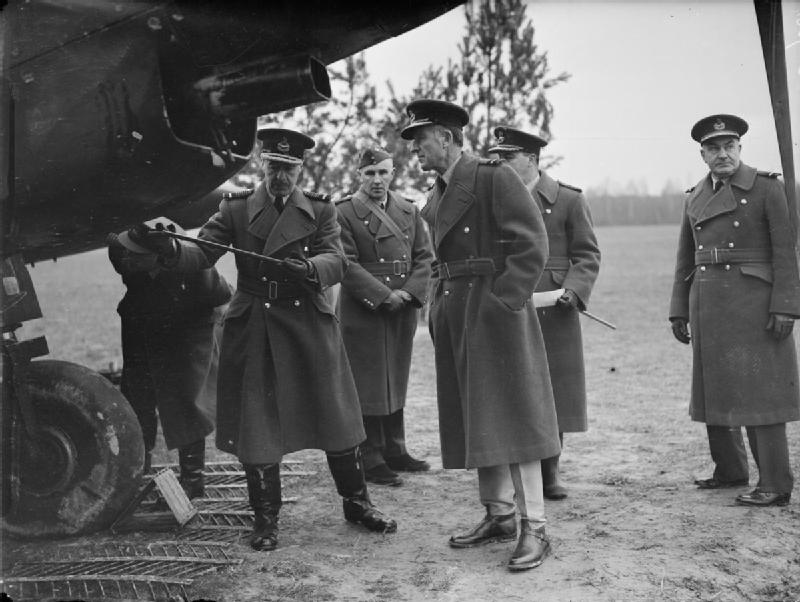
Royal Air Force officers in greatcoats inspecting a Fairey Battle in France, 1939

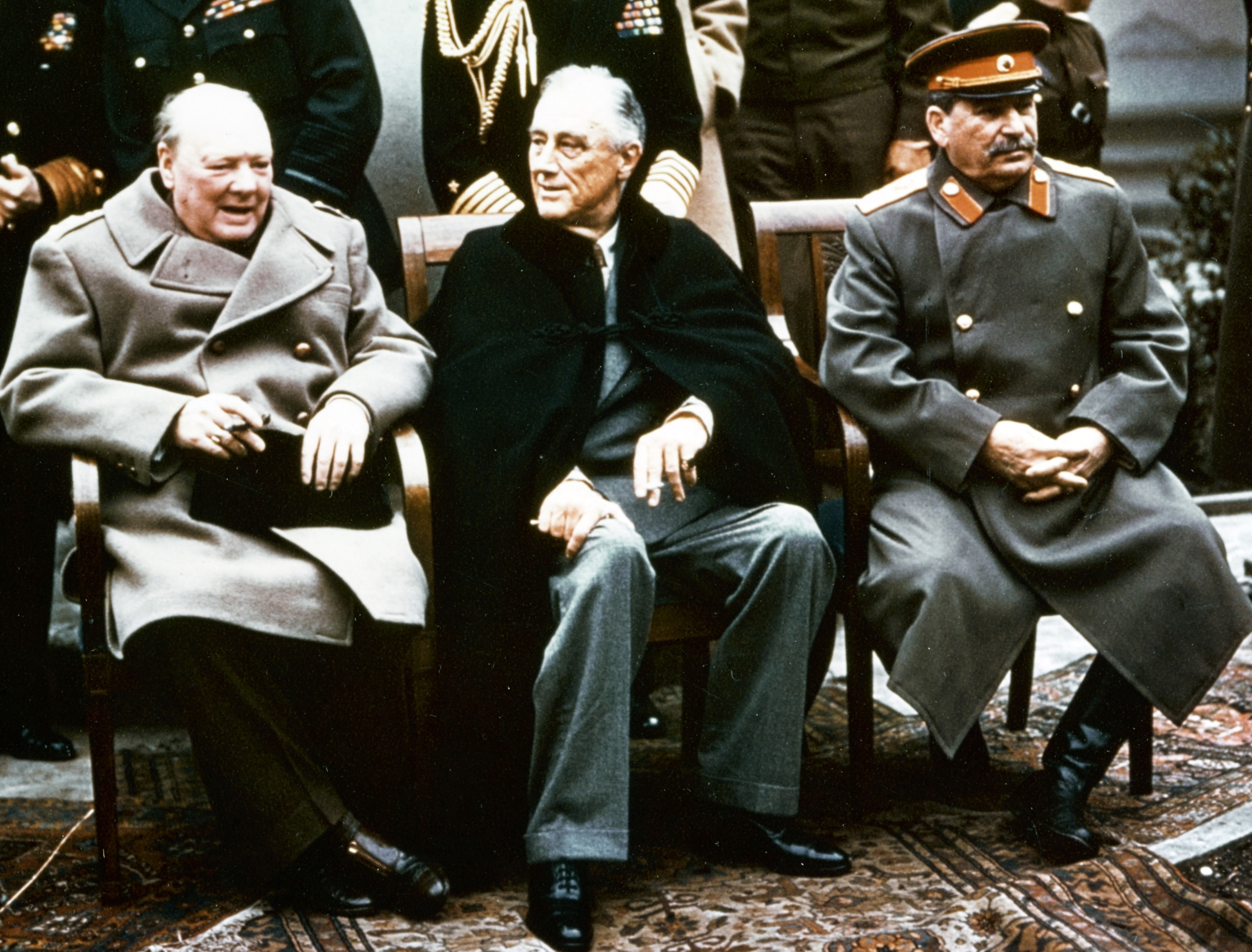
Winston Churchill (left) and Joseph Stalin (right) dressed in greatcoats at the Yalta Conference, 1945

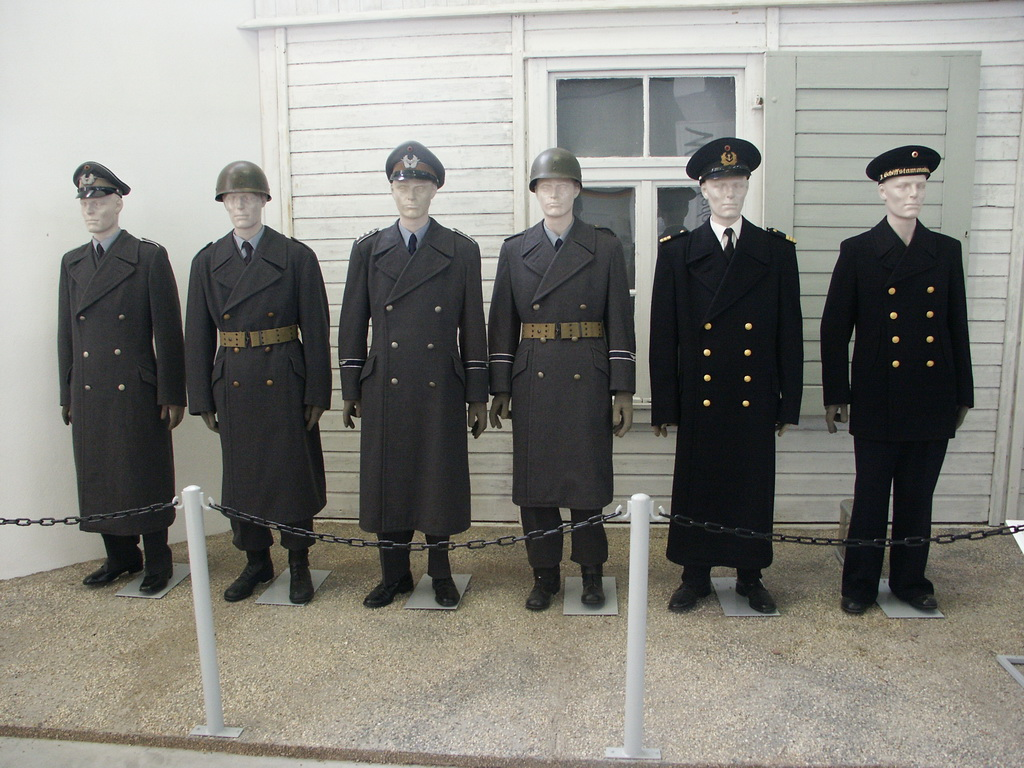
Mannequins wearing Bundeswehr greatcoats of the 1960s

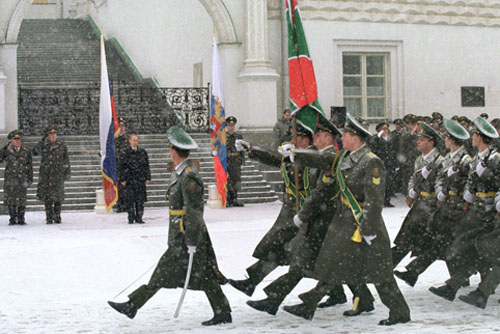
Members of the FSB Border Service of Russia parading in greatcoat uniforms, 2002

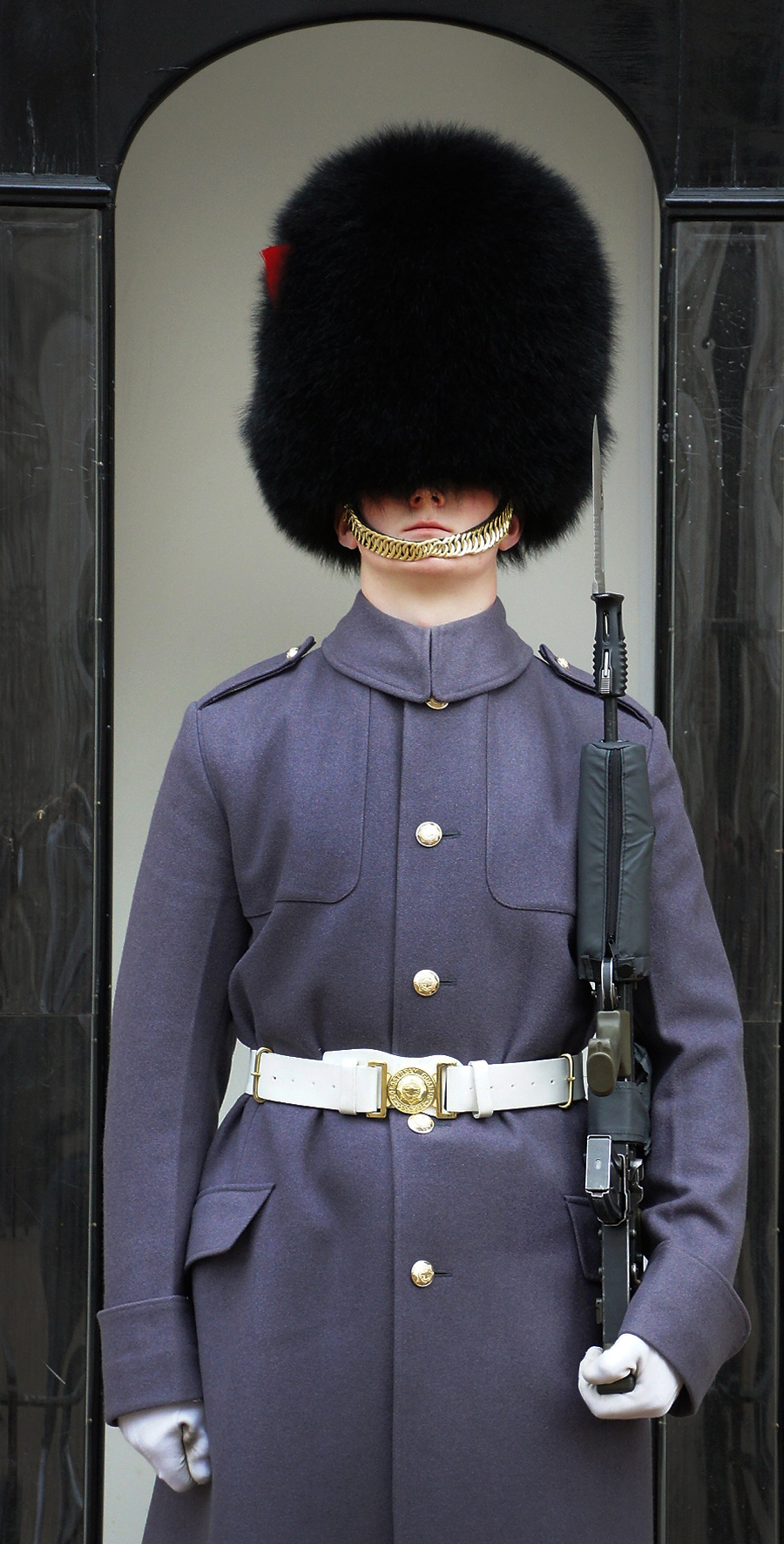
A sentry of the Coldstream Guards dressed in a greatcoat, 2011

== See also ==
- Trench coat
- Livery
