= History of slavery in Michigan =

The history of slavery in Michigan includes the pro-slavery and anti-slavery efforts of the state's residents prior to the ratification of the Thirteenth Amendment to the United States Constitution in 1865.

== Slavery ==
Slavery in Michigan began centuries ago with the French when they began to trade with indigenous people in the 16th century. Detroit was founded at the beginning of the 18th century, at which point the number of enslaved people began to be recorded. While the records are incomplete and therefore under-report the numbers, historian Marcel Trudel counted 523 Native American and 127 black enslaved people, for a total of 650 people, from the 18th and early 19th century Detroit. The average lifespan for enslaved Native Americans was 17.2 years; for blacks, the average life span was 25.2 years.

About 10% of early Detroit's population was made up of indentured servants, who worked for five to seven years paying off the cost of their transportation to the New World or debts. Although they were free, their contracts could be bought and sold.

=== Native Americans ===
When fighting other tribes, the victorious Native American tribe would capture the women and children and assimilate them into their communities. They also captured people to replace warriors who died in battle. They did not consider slaves their property, although slaves were used as gifts during negotiations and trade. Enslaved people were traded among other tribes. Subject to torture, many enslaved people had their ears cut off or their eyes gouged out. The children of enslaved indigenous people were not automatically classified as slaves. After years of submission and serial rape, some women rose to have social acceptance and their freedom. Slavery may have been a practice for hundreds of years before contact with Europeans.

=== New France (1534–1763) ===
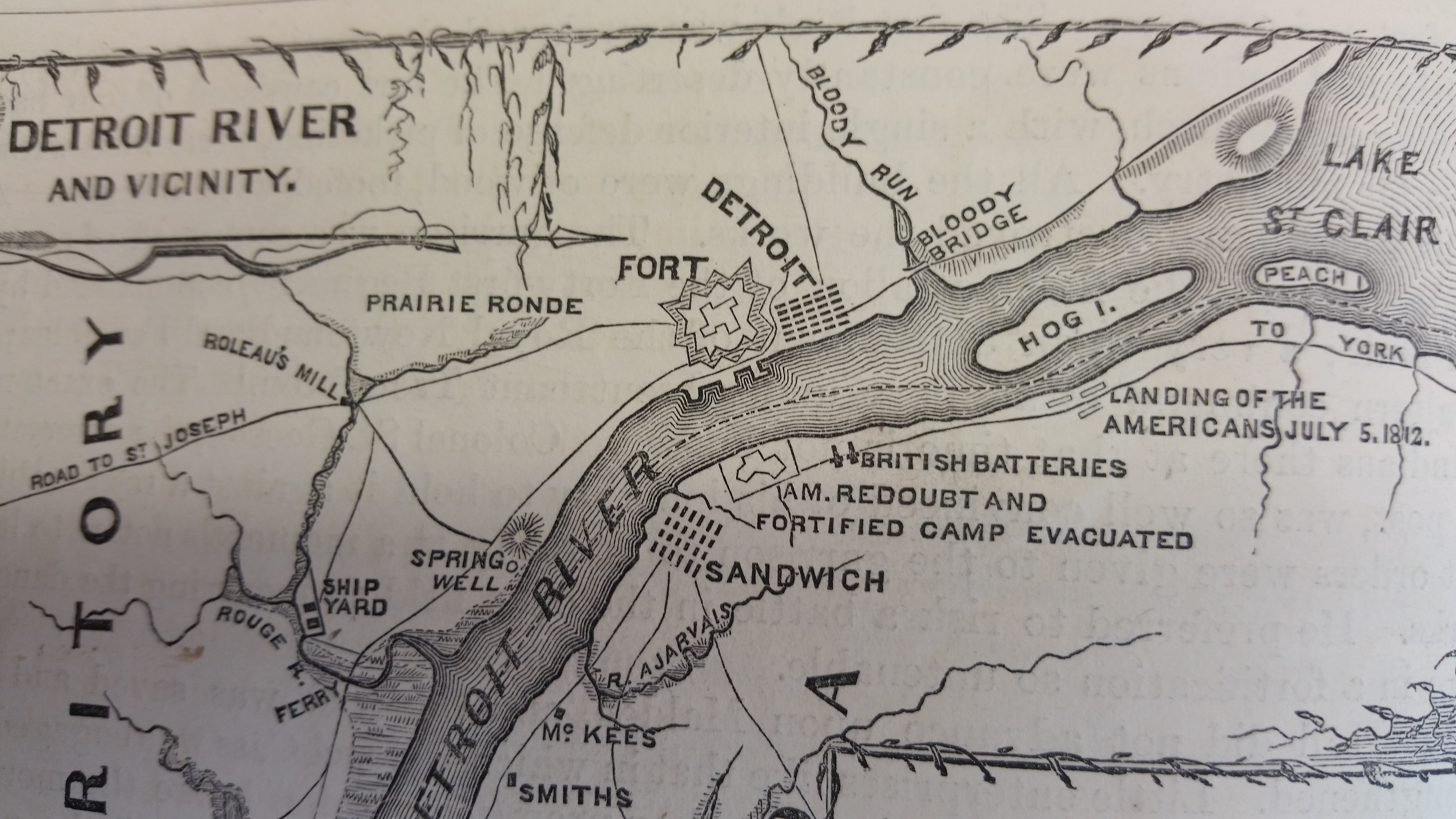
Location of Fort Pontchartrain du Détroit

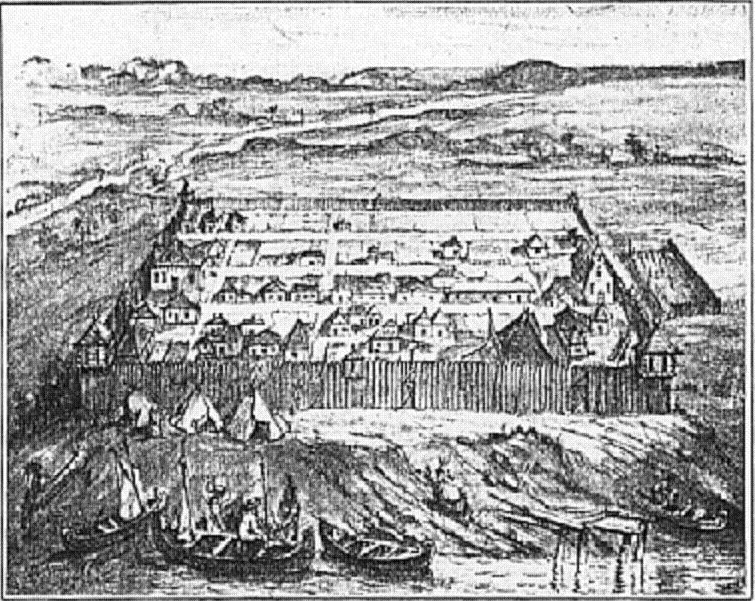
Fort Pontchartrain du Détroit in 1710

When the French came to present-day Michigan, they had slaves and encouraged native people to trade enslaved people. Most of slaves in present-day Michigan resided in Detroit or at the trading post at the Straits of Mackinac, later on Mackinac Island. Slavery was practiced in Detroit since its founding in 1701. The settlement included Fort Ponchartrain, a government trade store on the Detroit River, and ribbon farms.

New France issued the Raudot Ordinance of 1709, which legalized slavery in the colony. Both the French citizens and their slaves were Roman Catholics in New France. Louis XV's ordinance of 1724 (Code Noir) required that slaves were to be educated and baptized. They had designated godparents who were free. The enslaved people's major life events—from birth through death—occurred within the auspices of the church. The role of the church meant that slaveholders did not have absolute dominion over their bondservants.

Fur traders used enslaved Native Americans and African Americans to operate boats, handle furs, grow food, cook, and clean. About 25% of Detroit's populations were enslaved workers, but they produced one half of the town's primary products: beef, oats, and wheat. Fur traders who lived in the wilderness took Native American enslaved women as partners and companions, some of whom became interpreters or paid subordinant traders. Some farmers owned and worked alongside their slaves or hired men. As an example, John Askin, an 18th-century fur trader owned eight enslaved people; one of them, an Odawa woman named Monette, gave birth to three of Askin's children.

=== British American colony (1763–1787) ===
Enslaved blacks were brought to Detroit by British settlers; some of them came from slave markets in New York. Native Americans raided European settlements to preserve Native American territorial lands. During these raids, they captured black bondservants. Native tribes often traveled with military soldiers, and some officers owned slaves.

There were 73 slaves in Detroit in 1773; by 1782 the number had grown to 170. Free and enslaved blacks were recruited to fight during the American Revolutionary War, and the enslaved men were freed in return. Blacks received veteran's benefits. Two Black Loyalists of Butler's Rangers gained their freedom and received land grants near Detroit.

=== Northwest Territory (1787–1803) ===
When the Northwest Territory was formed in 1787, the Northwest Ordinance made slavery illegal with the clause "Neither slavery nor involuntary servitude shall exist in the territory". Even so, there were still enslaved people living in Michigan until 1837. French and British slaveowners in the Northwest Territory continued to own slaves due to loopholes in American law. The ordinance was interpreted to mean that no more new slaves could be brought into the area.

The Jay Treaty between Great Britain and the United States made it illegal to buy and sell slaves. The treaty did not change the status, though, of 300 existing slaves who lived in Detroit in 1795. Catholic priests owned slaves, and a slave helped build the Basilica of Sainte Anne de Détroit in 1800. Enslaved people helped build the city of Detroit. Enslaved people generally slept on their slaveholder's kitchen floors. Subject to physical violence, some people were maimed. Women were subject to sexual violence. Some enslaved people were hired out to others, which allowed them freedom to walk in the streets of the city. Some bondservants married into families of slaveholders.

Elijah Brush was a slaveholder, who also argued for an enslaved family's liberty. William Macomb, the owner of Grosse Ile, owned 26 bondservants, which was rare. The Campaus and Woodwards, leading families in Detroit, were also slave owners. Other slave-owning families prominent in Detroit were the Abbott, Beaubien, Beaufait, Cass, Dequindre, Gouin, Groesbeck, Hamtramck, Livernois, McDougall, Meldrum, and Rivard families.

=== Michigan Territory (1805–1837) ===
There was a gradual reduction in slaves heading into the 19th century. Some individuals were manumitted voluntarily by their owners. Enslaved people found safety with Michigan Territory residents, in Canada, or working along the Great Lakes. John Askin's bondswoman Madeline and others fled him to work along the Great Lakes.

Anti-slavery sentiment grew over time, so that by the 19th century, once an individual crossed the international border to or from Canada, people were free and were not returned to slavery. Slave catchers who searched for fugitives were harassed in Detroit. In 1806, an overseer was illegally tarred and feathered. Following Detroit's devastating fire of 1805, the plan to rebuild included giving land grants to free and some enslaved black people.

Some filed freedom suits, or writs of habeas corpus, but few won their freedom through the courts, even when it was clear that people remained enslaved illegally. One case, In the Matter of Elizabeth Denison, Et. Al., was tried in 1807. A farmer, William Tucker, owned members of the black Denison family. He willed that Peter and Hannah should be freed after his and his wife's death. Their children were willed to the family of Tucker's brother. The Denisons initiated a ground-breaking lawsuit for the freedom of the children, citing the anti-slavery provisions of the Northwest Ordinance. Judge Augustus Woodward and the Michigan Supreme Court ruled that the children—Lisette, James, Scipio and Peter Denison—should be enslaved. The Denison family crossed into Canada, where they lived until Woodward later ruled that enslaved people who became free by living in Canada would not be returned to Michigan Territory slaveholders. Lisette became a successful businesswoman and property owner. In the meantime, there were two people from Canada who were released in 1808 as the result of their freedom suits. The following year, a boy named Thomas and a woman named Hannah were released.

By 1810, there were 24 slaves in Michigan, 17 of whom were in Detroit. Free and enslaved blacks were recruited to fight during the Chesapeake crisis and during the War of 1812, which released the enslaved men from the bonds of slavery.

Mayor John R. Williams used enslaved people for forced labor. In 1817, Williams sought to purchase two Native American teenage children who he planned to hold as indentured servants until they were 30 years of age. Although there were known slaves in the Michigan Territory in 1820, there were none recorded in the census. The Detroit Free Press, founded in 1831, supported slavery leading up to the Civil War.

After freeing themselves in Kentucky, Thornton and Lucie Blackburn arrived in Detroit in 1831. In 1833, free and enslaved blacks rioted against the imprisonment of the Blackburn family in what is called the Blackburn Riots. Rioters wounded the sheriff in the process of freeing the Blackburns and threatened to set the city on fire.

An enslaved woman named Rachel was held as a slave in Michigan Territory before being sold to a new slaveholder in Missouri Territory. In 1834, she filed the freedom suit Rachel v. Walker, which was lost in the lower court. She appealed to the Supreme Court of Missouri, where she won the case and her freedom in 1836.

Slavery was banned throughout the British Empire, including Canada, with the Slavery Abolition Act 1833. Two years later, there were two slaves in Monroe County and one in Cass County. Slavery was banned in Michigan Territory in 1835 with the Constitution of Michigan in the runup to statehood in 1837.

== Anti-slavery movement ==
In 1832, the first anti-slavery society in Michigan was founded by the Quaker Elizabeth Chandler in a meetinghouse in Adrian, Michigan. Laura Haviland became a member of the society. The Michigan Anti-Slavery Society was founded in 1836 in Ann Arbor, Michigan.

George DeBaptiste was considered to be the "president" of the Detroit Underground Railroad, William Lambert the "vice president" or "secretary", and Laura Haviland the "superintendent". The Second Baptist Church of Detroit, a stop on the Underground Railroad, was organized in 1836. Freedom seekers crossed the Detroit River into Canada. Henry Bibb, who freed himself from slavery, became a resident of Michigan in 1842. He was the son of an enslaved woman and her master. He began to explain the ways in which exlaved people were treated in the South and encouraged enslaved people to "break your chains and fly for freedom".

In 1847, Raiders from Kentucky came to Cass County and tried to kidnap at least nine formerly enslaved people. Adam Crosswhite and his family, former enslaved people living in Marshall, were among those that they tried to capture (Marshall Crosswhite Affair). The Personal Liberty Act of 1855 was passed by the Michigan legislature, which made it harder for enslaved people to be captured and returned to slavery.

Sojourner Truth, a former enslaved woman and abolitionist, moved to Battle Creek in 1857. She published The Narrative of Sojourner Truth and a became national speaker for the anti-slavery and women's movements.

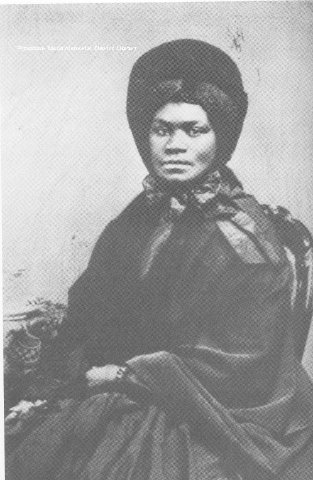
Lisette Denison Forth (c. 1786–1866)

The Emancipation Proclamation was issued by President Abraham Lincoln in 1863. It freed enslaved African Americans in the Confederate States. The First Michigan Colored Infantry Regiment was formed in 1864 to fight in the Civil War. The Thirteenth Amendment to the United States Constitution of 1865 banned slavery.

== See also ==
- Capital punishment in Michigan § History

== Bibliography ==
- Katzman, D. M. (1970). "Black Slavery in Michigan". American Studies. 11 (2): 56–66.
