= Elizabeth Denison =

Elizabeth Denison may refer to:

- Lisette Denison Forth (1786–1866), freed slave who funded the construction of Grosse Ile, Michigan's St. James Episcopal Church
- Elizabeth Conyngham, Marchioness Conyngham (1769–1861), née Denison, last mistress of King George IV of the United Kingdom
