= Slavery in New France =

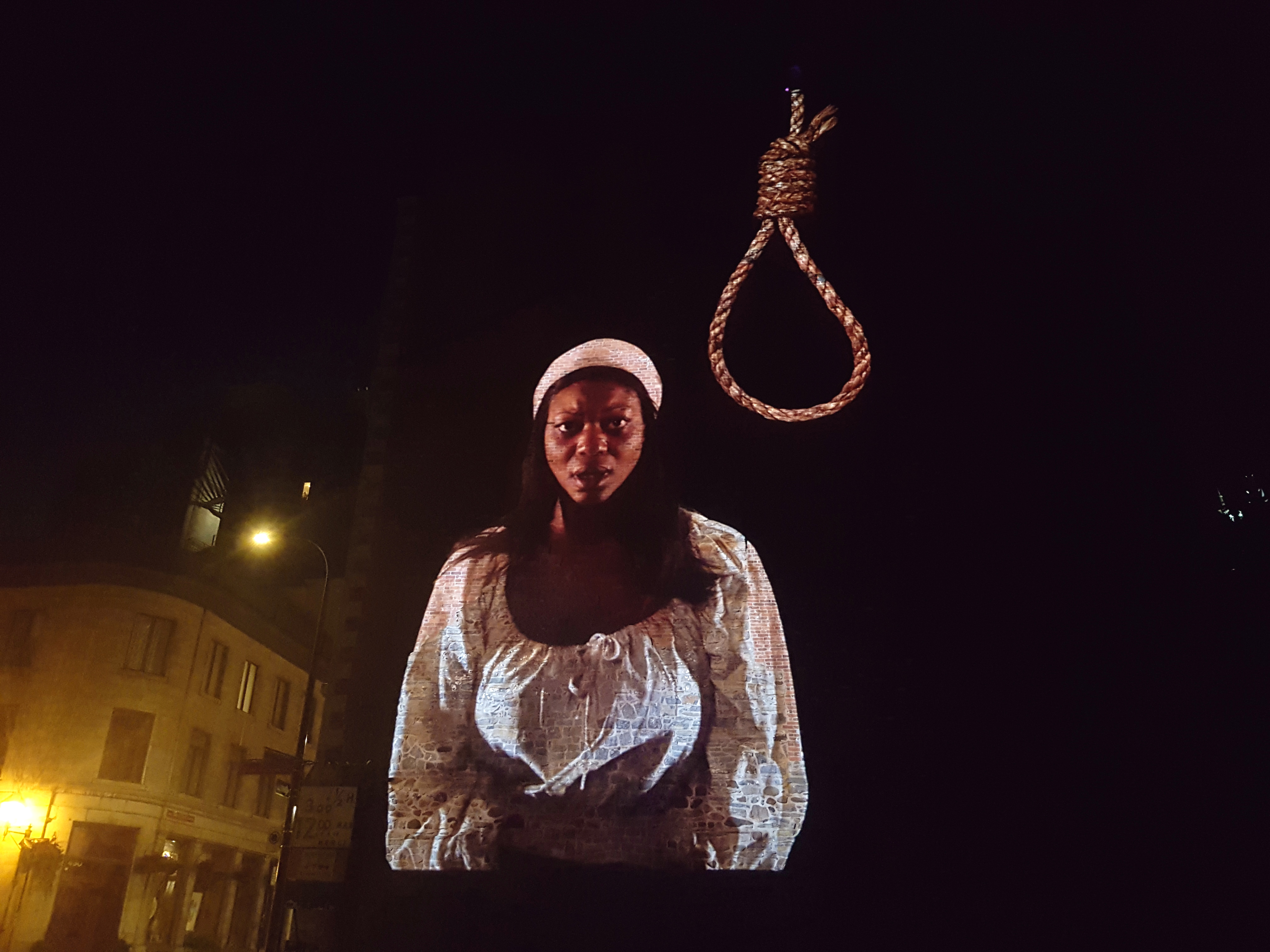
A 21st-century projection depicting Marie-Josèphe dite Angélique, a female slave who was executed for arson in New France in 1734

Slavery in New France was practiced by some of the Indigenous populations, which enslaved outsiders as captives in warfare, until European colonization that made commercial chattel slavery become common in New France. By 1750, two-thirds of the enslaved peoples in New France were Indigenous, and by 1834, most enslaved people were African.

The institution, which endured for almost two centuries, affected thousands of men, women, and children descended from Indigenous and African peoples. It also impacted many Indigenous people, who were used as domestic servants and traded as goods.

== Indigenous slavery ==
Slavery in the Pays d'en Haut predates the arrival of Europeans. Indigenous groups of the region relied extensively on warfare that focused on captive-taking. Siouan and Algonquins practiced slavery differently than Europeans and other forms of indigenous North American slavery.

Slaves' living condition could be deshumanizing or quasi-familial, and their position within the community could change.

=== Slave acquisition ===
Raids were sparked by communal discussions about issues such as a need for reliatation or a raid to weaken an enemy. Warriors then travelled to enemy territory to capture slaves – to great glory if they succeeded. (Note: Warriors made marks on their clubs or tattoos showing how successful they were in taking slaves.) Healthy young people would generally be taken as slaves.

As soon as they were a safe distance from the raided locality, captives had their hands tied and were made to run at full speed to flee any pursuer. They were led by a leash and abused physically and verbally. Slaves that could not keep up were struck on the head and scalped. At night, they would be tightly bound to stakes to prevent escape, also "[symbolizing] the victim's powerlessness and inferiority".

When brought back to the village, the arriving war chief showed that he had arrived by making high-pitched cries, one for each captured slave. The slaves would then run the gauntlet, during which they would have fingers and other extremities cut off, their nails be torn out, their nose cropped and/or be beaten. It was a public affair involving all sections of Indigenous society, including women and children. This resulted in lasting demarcations and scarring which showed the individual's captive status.

Those surviving would then be forced to undress and sing before being integrated into their new community or painfully killed, after a selection process. Children and women were more often spared, for their ease of assimilation in the new community and their ability to reproduce respectively. Male warriors were commonly traded.

They were washed, clothed and given a new name, commonly the name of the deceased relative which they replaced. Warriors owned the slaves they captured as their private possessions, and anyone wishing to adopt or kill a slave needed to bargain with them. Village politics required that slaves be distributed, but warriors could keep slaves they chose and had to be compensated for giving away slaves (without a fixed price).

This brutal series of events was designed to strip the individual of any identifications from prior groups and integrate him as a subservient slave.

=== Status of the slave ===
Slaves were a form of personal property akin to domestic animals or objects, owned by individuals or families. In fact, they were one of the strongest form of such property for the Native American of the Pays d'en Haut.

Private property including slaves was owned for practical purposes, and its accumulation did not bring a higher status.

Slaves were constantly threatened with violence and insulted, and could indeed be hurt if not killed even years after integration in the village.

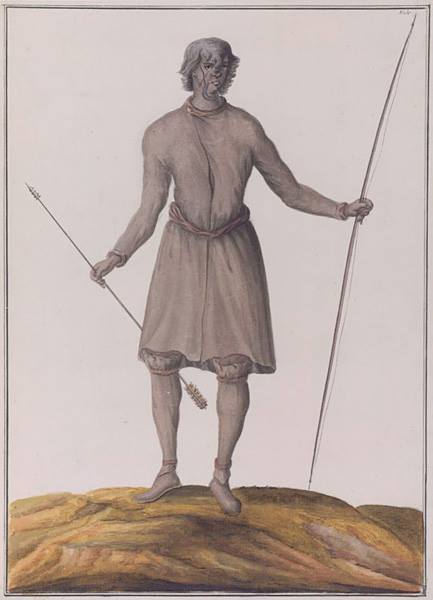
Slave of the Foxes, around 1732

=== Utility ===
==== Adoption ====
Captives could be used to replace dead household members. It was the most commonly observed form of slavery by the French.

Captives replaced the dead member's role ("place") in the household, and not their persona. It was not adoption into a family, although there was still some kind of kinship between the adopted and the adoptees. Actual family members were favored over these "feigned parents", or "fictive kins".

While having been adopted into a household, these slaves were still considered personal property, dishonored by villagers and under threat of violence.

==== Work force ====
Slaves were under the supervision of women, who generally managed the household in the matrifocal cultures of the Pays d'en Haut. They worked in agriculture and other useful manners, mostly subsistence activities. They did not produce export commodities.

Adoptees were expected to do the work of the household member they replaced. Accordingly, men often took tasks generally assigned to children and women, such as providing farm labor, serving meals and carrying packs, which was humiliating (as was being supervised by women). They also prepared skins (Note: Also a female-gendered task) and sometimes even hunted (although never alone) thus helping in the time-consuming and demanding activity of hunting.

Female captives were often used as secondary "chore" wives, who were used for reproductive labor and routine household acts such as drawing water and gathering wood. They also labored in the fields, as they did in their home villages.

Being the secondary wife of a successful hunter or an important chief could help rise slaves' and their children's social status. These female slaves were vulnerable to violence and neglect due to their slave status (Note: Notably due to the lack of family to protect them, unlike primary wives.).

Slaves carried sick masters on a litter. Slaves could carry their master's body to the burial place and inform the village of their death.

==== Politics ====
Slaves could be agents of diplomacy. They were often translators and "intercultural brokers" between their people and their master's, and could help the acquisition of languages. They could in this way acquire a status as an important intermediary. Some slaves were traded multiple times and thus knew multiple languages.

Slaves could also be freed and sent with an unpleasant message to their own people.

Slaves could also be objects of diplomacy. Captives could be freed as a gesture of goodwill to eventually make peace.

==== Slavery's role in warfare ====
Slavery in general was designed as a deterrent conflicts: to raid would mean to risk enslavement of one's own people. It "stopped warfare from overtaking the region".

=== Relationship with French slavery ===
Natives flooded the slave market in the course of intense diplomacy with the French to prevent colonial encroachment of Native land. Therefore, the flood of Native slaves in St. Lawrence largely came from their Western counterparts. According to Rushforth, "by narrowing the target to a specific set of victims known as the 'Panis nation', Raudot and his successors created a North American counterpart to the African kingdom of Nigritie: a distant and populous nation at war with more proximate allies, poorly understood but identified as legally and morally enslavable". Effectively, this meant Western Natives were strengthening future adversaries in the east, with their own slaves, in a struggle to preserve their land.

French settlers primarily acquired slaves through the process of ritualized gift-giving commonly used to facilitate diplomatic negotiations. However French hunger for more slaves altered indigenous practices of captive-taking and enslavement. Warfare focusing on captive taking increased, as captives became not just a way to symbolically replace lost relatives, but also became economically valuable goods to exchange with the French. Networks of alliances between Indigenous groups helped funnel captives towards the French.

The exchange of slaves and different understandings about the nature of slavery also had real impacts on French relationships with their native neighbors. Protracted conflicts, such as the Fox Wars, were largely encouraged because war captives provided an ample source of new slaves. Indigenous nations allied to the French and antagonistic to the Fox used this incentive to leverage French military support.

At other times, different conceptions of slavery stood in the way of relationships. Denonville's decision to send 40 captured Iroquois to France as galley slaves proved to be a major roadblock to future peace negotiations between the French and the Iroquois. Similarly, diplomatic talks with Sioux chiefs in 1742 were marred by the presence of Sioux slaves who had ended up in French possession.

== European slavery ==
A system of slavery was well underway before French arrival, which the French adapted in their practice of slavery. Initially, slavery in the colony was complicated by France's ethical stance on the matter: slave ownership in New France was not legally recognized (as per their free-soil doctrine), but it could still be justified with the understanding that only the act of enslaving people was deemed unethical and simply buying or receiving slaves was accepted.

Slavery had already been well established in the Indigenous and French alliances throughout the seventeenth and eighteenth centuries. Many inhabitants claimed that slavery had no legal standing in New France and encouraged slaves to flee. To stop this, intendant Jacques Raudot passed the Ordinance Rendered on the Subject of the Negroes and the Savages Called Panis on 13 April 1709, legalizing the purchase and possession of indigenous and black slaves in New France. According to the ordinance, the entire panis (pawnee) nation was considered to be slaves. The ordinance resulted in the increased acquisition of Native American slaves, and the sale of slaves became increasingly notarized.

in 1710, Raudot ruled in a court case that slaves cannot be exported outside New France and that a panis leaving New France is freed. Some slaves were still exported to the Antilles, both by the state and private owners. Projects to send Native American slaves to the Antilles were proposed in 1706, 1708, 1747 and 1749, but they all failed. There are cases of slaves being sent to France, although it is unknown if they stayed slaves.

From 1728 onward, blacks found on foreign vessels were confiscated by the state. From 1748 onward, black slaves fleeing from enemy colonies continued being slaves and had to be sold for the state's profits. They were however not extradited.

Slaves came from tribes that were not formally allied to the French, although there were a few exceptions. Christian Native Americans could be slaves, as confirmed by Hocquart in a 1733 court case.

Hocquart explained the lawsuit to the king and requested a formal law on Native American slavery, but the king refused to do so in 1734, without overturning Hocquart's decision on the lawsuit. In 1735 and 1736, he repeated his refusal to decide on this matter and left the governor and the intendant decide on this matter. This decision may have been to facilitate alliances with Native American nations, but was more likely a continuation of France's general policy of assimilation and not destruction of Native Americans.

On 1st September 1736, Hocquart published an ordinance mandating that the freeing of a slave be notarized, lest it be void.

== Regional characteristics of slavery ==
=== Slavery in Canada ===
Origin of slaves in Canada 1671–1760
First Nations	African	Sum
1685	402	2087

Thousands of people were legally held as slaves in Canada during the colonial period, used as status symbols and servants for wealthy individuals, the local government, and religious organizations including the Grey Nuns. Black slaves exploited by the French were brought from other colonies like Martinique or captured from African regions like Madagascar.

Source: (Note: The 1714 total doesn't match the actual total of both types of slaves; this is an error from the original source.)

The first slave in Canada, named Olivier Le Jeune, was brought by David Kirke in 1629, sold to a local and then in 1632 given to another. The next black slave only appeared 25 years later.

Unlike Native Americans, French slave-owners did not subject their slaves to undue forms of torture as European understanding of kinship and adoption were radically different from that of indigenous peoples. Instead, many slave-owners opted to baptize their slaves and christen them with a new name. Those who wished to keep the origins of their slave a secret requested that their slave be identified as "panis" on their baptismal records. However, some slave-owners delayed the baptism of their slaves while others never bothered to baptize them at all. For example, slave-owner Desmoulins baptized Thomas, his black slave, at the age of sixty while Phillippe Vinet-Préville baptized his slave on the day of her death at the age of fifty-five.

Due to their lowly status, many official documents have neglected to specify the kinds of jobs held by slaves. In the Census of 1666, for example, slaves are merely identified as "domestic engagé". Some legal documents did provide information on the status of a slave, the nature of their tasks and sometimes, their hobbies and interests.

Efforts to "frenchify" indigenous or black slaves through clothing or conversion was not uncommon during the seventeenth and eighteenth centuries. For example, in 1731 a widow by the name of Marie LeRoy wrote a will expressing that her sauvagesse be given her "'habit de crepon', several 'aulnes' of white cloth with which might make 'coeffes', and a 'jupon' so that she might remember her for the remainder of her life, and live in Christian fashion".

==== The Code noir ====
The Code noir was not legally valid in Canada, be it the French West Indies' or Louisiana's, and there were no specific rules on the treatment of slaves in royal edicts, ordinances, acts in public registries transcribed by the Conseil supérieur or Raudot's ordinance. However, owners generally complied with the Code noir without requirement to do so, and slaves were still considered to be personal property.

Yet, the Code noir was not always followed to the letter. Corporal punishment was less severe. In front of the court, slaves were generally treated equally to free persons - if not with leniency. Slaves could be the plaintiffs in civil cases. Whereas slaves had no legal capacity in the Code noir, they could and often did act as witnesses in the Canada on the same footing as free persons. For slaves to survive the harsh weather, they needed better clothing than the minimum prescribed by the Code noir. There is at least one case of an owner taking only a portion of his slave's earnings (whereas according to the Code noir, he was entitled to all of it)

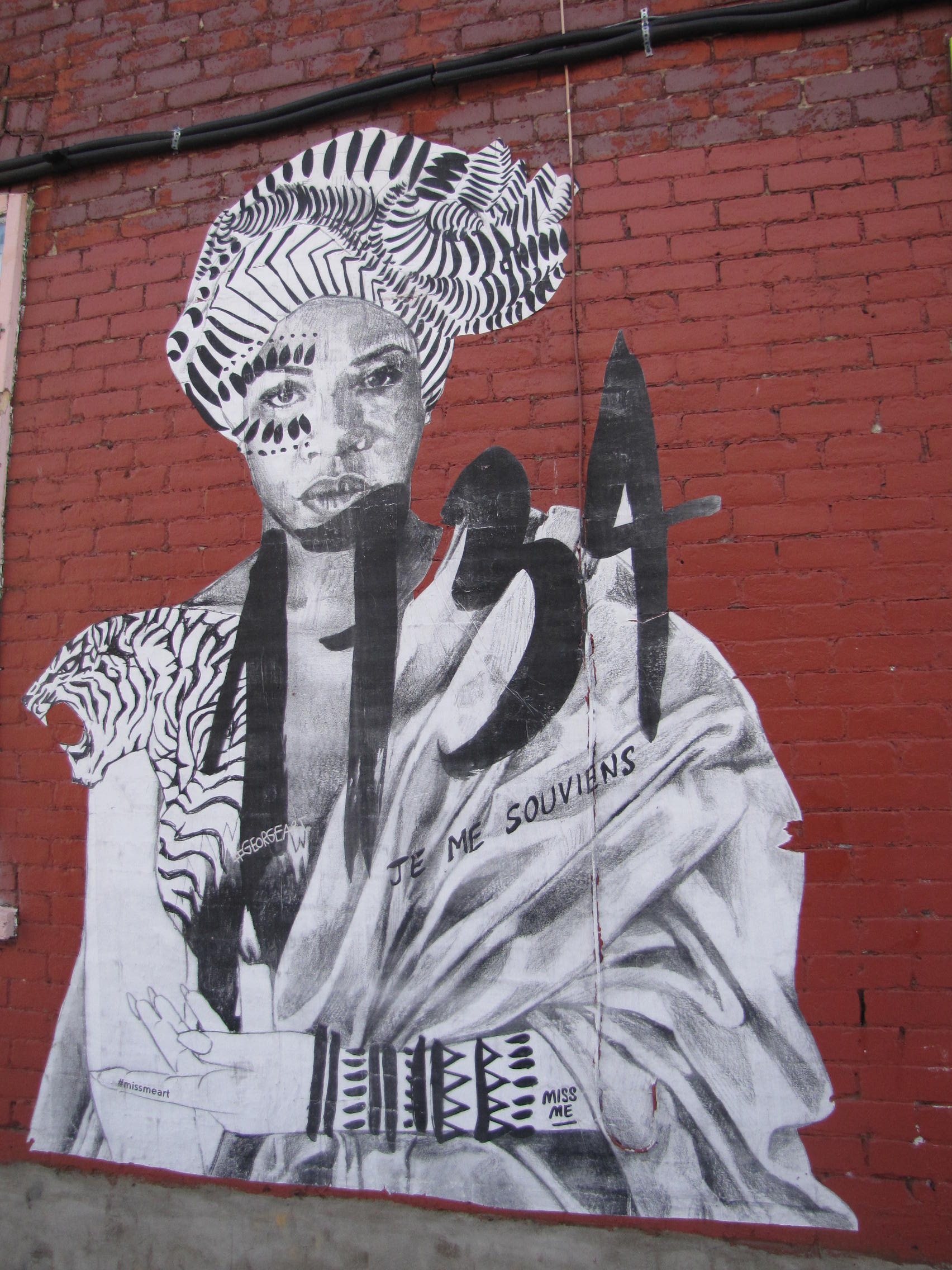
Descendants of Black slaves from New France and Lower Canada have family names as Carbonneau, Charest, Johnson, Lafleur, Lemire, Lepage, Marois, Paradis, etc.

==== Attempts at expanding african slave trade ====
Several attempts were made to increase the number of African slaves brought to the colony to increase the available workforce. Attempts to increase the economic output of mines, fisheries, and farms were frustrated by the lack of workers. However, attempts at modeling Canada on other colonies were frustrated both by historical accidents and changing colonial policy. There was much concern that the introduction of African enslavement in Canada would be a costly economic option, citing the major differences in climate as the main reason for its possible failure. The importation of black slaves was authorized in 1689 and 1701, but were curtailed by the outbreak of the Nine Years' War and the Seven Years' War.

Beyond the difficulties of establishing slave trading networks in New France, economic factors further hindered their development; New France had less potential for high-profit plantation agriculture compared to other colonies, and the availability of indigenous slaves generally meant that there were fewer profitable opportunities for selling slaves in New France.

=== Slavery in the Illinois Country ===
In the Illinois Country, the Illinois participated heavily in slave trading with the indigenous allies and the French. Their economy revolved around bison hunting (Note: The meat, which was tediously processed and dried, was a staple of their diet. Bison skins were used for decoration, clothing and diplomatic gifts.), thus requiring a lot of manpower that was mostly obtained through slavery. Female slaves and wives divided the work amongst each other.

Slavery also allowed to strengthen their relationship with their allies, including the French. Captives taken from their enemies, the Meskwaki, were offered to the French. The trading of slaves was a ritualized performance that reinforced kinship alliance with the French. The French, in turn, accepted the slaves and baptized them—stripping them of their ethnic and cultural identity in an effort to Christianize them.

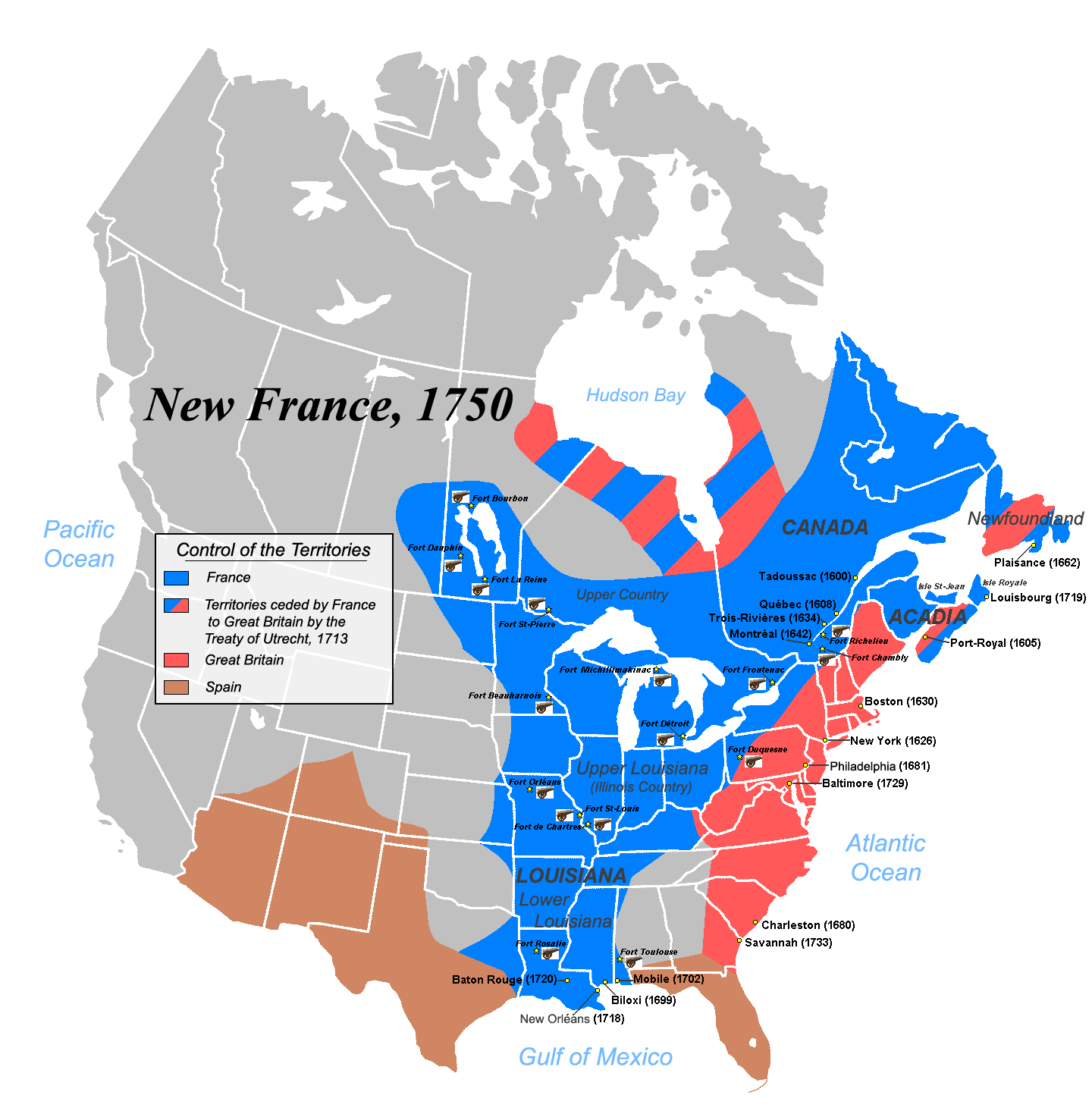
New France, 1750

American Indian Slave Halter. Eighteenth Century, Great Lakes Region. Colonial Williamsburg Collection, 1996-816. Courtesy The Colonial Williamsburg Foundation. Taken from Rushforth, 2012.

Taking captives often led to violent retaliations from the Foxes. The French were eager to move westward and trade with the Foxes, but they needed to consider their kinship alliance indigenous groups in the Great Lakes region, notably the Illinois. To demand the Illinois to relinquish their captives to the Foxes was to offend them, but to ask the Foxes to seek new captives in distant regions threatened the Illinois' position as trusted middlemen to the French and thus would also offend them. Moreover, the French were reluctant to stop the Illinois from taking captives as they benefited from the Fox slave trade. After the port of New Orleans was founded in 1718 with access to the plantation colonies of the Caribbean, French colonists imported increased numbers of African slaves to the Illinois Country for use as mining or agricultural laborers. By the mid-eighteenth century, slaves accounted for as many as a third of the limited population in that rural area.

Man Holding a calumet. Louis Hennepin, Nouvelle découverte d'un très grand pays situé dans l'Amérique. Utrecht, 1697. Courtesy Special Collections Research Center, Swem Library, College of William and Mary. Taken from Rushforth, 2012.

=== Slavery on Île-Royale ===
Hundreds of black slaves likely traveled through the port of Louisbourg in the colony of Île-Royale aboard merchant vessels, but only 216 black individuals were actually enslaved on Île-Royale. Most of these slaves were owned by the wealthiest individuals of Île-Royale (merchants, government and military officials), whose living conditions and social status were increased by slave owning.

The slaves of Ile Royale had very different backgrounds as some came from the Dutch West Indies while others directly came from Guinea. Slaves on the island had a variety of occupations including servants, gardeners, bakers, tavern keepers, stonemasons, soldiers, sailors, fisherman and hospital workers.

Enslaved blacks were part of the community and helped shape colonial life. They were part of a growing African-French colonial culture.

=== Slavery in Louisiana ===
Although Louisiana was established much later than other colonies within New France in 1699, it still acquired blacks far more quickly than Canada as it had the advantage of being closer to the Caribbean market. It also had the opportunity to exploit the native market of the vast Mississippi valley. In Louisiana, plantation owners preferred African slaves; some still kept natives as maids, nevertheless.

Some Panis were enslaved by the beginning of the 18th century, even though it was prohibited officially. These slaves were captured by other native tribes during conflicts and then sold to the French.

In 1717, John Law advised the Mississippi Company to import black slaves into Louisiana to develop the economy with plantations. Around 6,000 black slaves were brought in between 1719 and 1743. Some slaves were sent to the Illinois Country, in Upper Louisiana, New France, a part of French North America, to work in the plantation fields and lead mines.

The Black Code regulated the condition of the slaves just like in the other French colonies, aside from Canada. The Black Code, nevertheless, was not highly respected and slaves enjoyed relative autonomy. During their days off, for example, slaves could cultivate a piece of land and then sell their produce. Others would hunt, log wood, or take care of cattle; all of these actives could occur far from the plantation. Even though interracial marriages and gatherings of slaves was prohibited, both of these practices were nonetheless recorded. Despite this small window of freedom, the lives and work of slaves remained extremely difficult. Harvest period was the most disagreeable season for them. Their belongings, in addition, were sparse and usually only consisted of a few personal items. Still, slave rebellions were rare during the French colonial period.

The slaves also contributed to the creolization of this part of the colony. Even if the Black Code mandated that slaves receive a Christian education, most continued their native practices.

== See also ==
- Indentured servitude in British America
  - Indentured servitude in Pennsylvania
  - Indentured servitude in Virginia
  - Redemptioner
- Slavery among the indigenous peoples of the Americas
  - Indian slave trade in the American Southeast
- Slavery in the colonial history of the United States
