= L'Arbre Croche =

L'Arbre Croche Waganagisi
- Region
- Etymology: crooked tree
- Location within Michigan
- Coordinates: 45°37′35″N 85°4′12″W (site of a historical marker in the center of what was the L'Arbre Croche region)
- Country: United States
- State: Michigan
- County: Emmet County

L'Arbre Croche, known by the Odawa people as Waganagisi, was a large Odawa settlement in Northern Michigan. The French called it L'Arbre Croche for the large crooked tree that marked the center of the settlement and was visible for many miles. It covered the region from Harbor Springs to Cross Village in present-day Emmet County, Michigan.

The Odawa moved with Jesuit missionaries to the L'Arbre Croche area in 1741. During the 18th and 19th centuries, the L'Arbre Croche community was closely affiliated with the French, British, and Americans stationed at the trading post and military garrison at Fort Michilimackinac and Fort Mackinac. The Odawa supplied furs, canoes, and food for the fur trade. They were particularly interdependent with the French, who established missions and churches in the community.

During the 1750s and 1760s, a smallpox outbreak devastated several indigenous communities in the region. An oral account written down by Odawa tribal leader and historian Andrew Blackbird claimed that the outbreak had "entirely depopulated and laid waste" to L'Arbre Croche. After the 1763 Treaty of Paris, the French vacated the region, and the British took control over Fort Michilimackinac.

Nissowaquet and the community's warriors sided with the British during the American Revolutionary War (1775–1783) and participated in several expeditions. After the area became part of the Michigan Territory (1805–1837), Native Americans lost much of their land. In 1836, the Odawa gave up land across most of the Eastern Upper Peninsula and Northern Lower Peninsula when they signed the Treaty of Washington. Chief Joseph Nowimashkote initiated a plan for the Odawa to buy back their land at Cross Village, also called La Croix in the 19th century. The village of Harbor Springs—established with a church, manse, a school, and the country's first temperance society—became the center of the L'Arbre Croche community in the early 19th century.

L'Arbre Croche is also known as the present Catholic community encompassing four churches, one of which is the St. Ignatius Church of Middle Village.

== Etymology ==
L'Arbre Croche means the crooked tree in French. The hooked top of the large pine tree was a prominent landmark for travelers on Lake Michigan. The tree, no longer standing, was located near Middle Village, 20 miles (32 km) north of Harbor Springs The Odawa name for the community was Waganagisi, meaning bent tree.

== Background ==
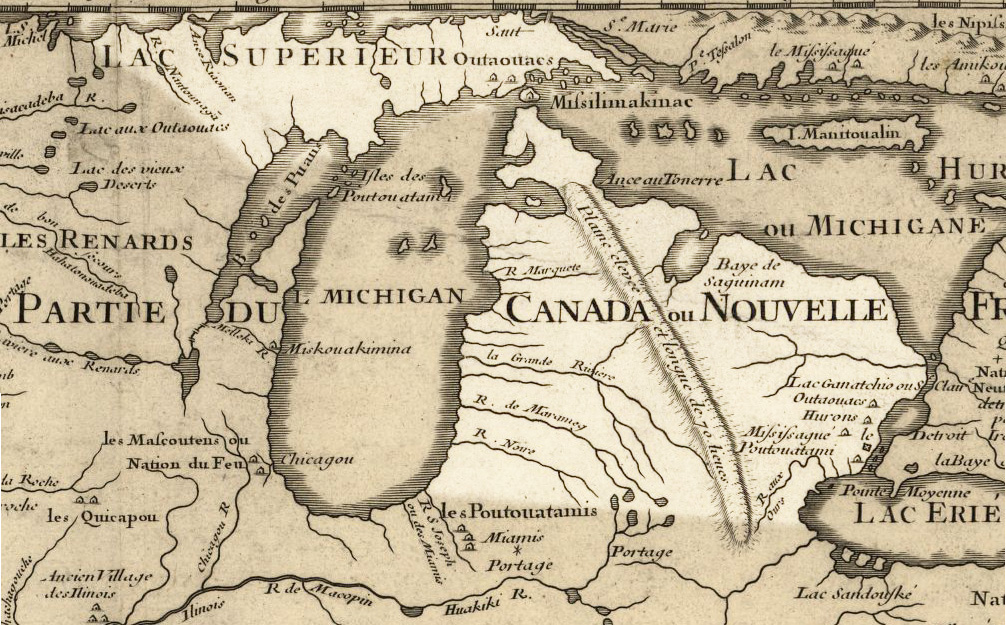
Michigan in 1718, Guillaume de L'Isle map, approximate state area highlighted. L'Arbre Croche is located southwest of Michilimackinac and along the shore of Lake Michigan to Little Traverse Bay

The French operated a fur trading post at Michilimackinac, in what is now the state of Michigan. The Odawa in the area traded fur pelts with the French. Jesuit missionary Jacques Marquette (1637–1675) established St. Ignace Mission at Michilimackinac in the late 17th century. Pierre du Jaunay, a Jesuit priest from France, served as a missionary at Michilimackinac beginning in 1735. From the Sainte-Anne log church, he served the French and later British residents, neighboring Native Americans, and visiting traders and explorers for almost 30 years. Nissowaquet was among the Odawa who lived at the village alongside Fort Michilimackinac.

In 1740, the Odawa determined that they needed to relocate to more arable land. Fort Michilimackinac Commandant Pierre Joseph Céloron de Blainville (Céloron) led the Odawa chiefs to Quebec to hold a council with the Marquis de Beauharnois (Beauharnois), who offered several locations for the Odawa to establish themselves. With Du Jaunay's encouragement, the Odawa chose the nearby area known as L'Arbre Croche.

== History ==
=== New France (1534–1763) ===
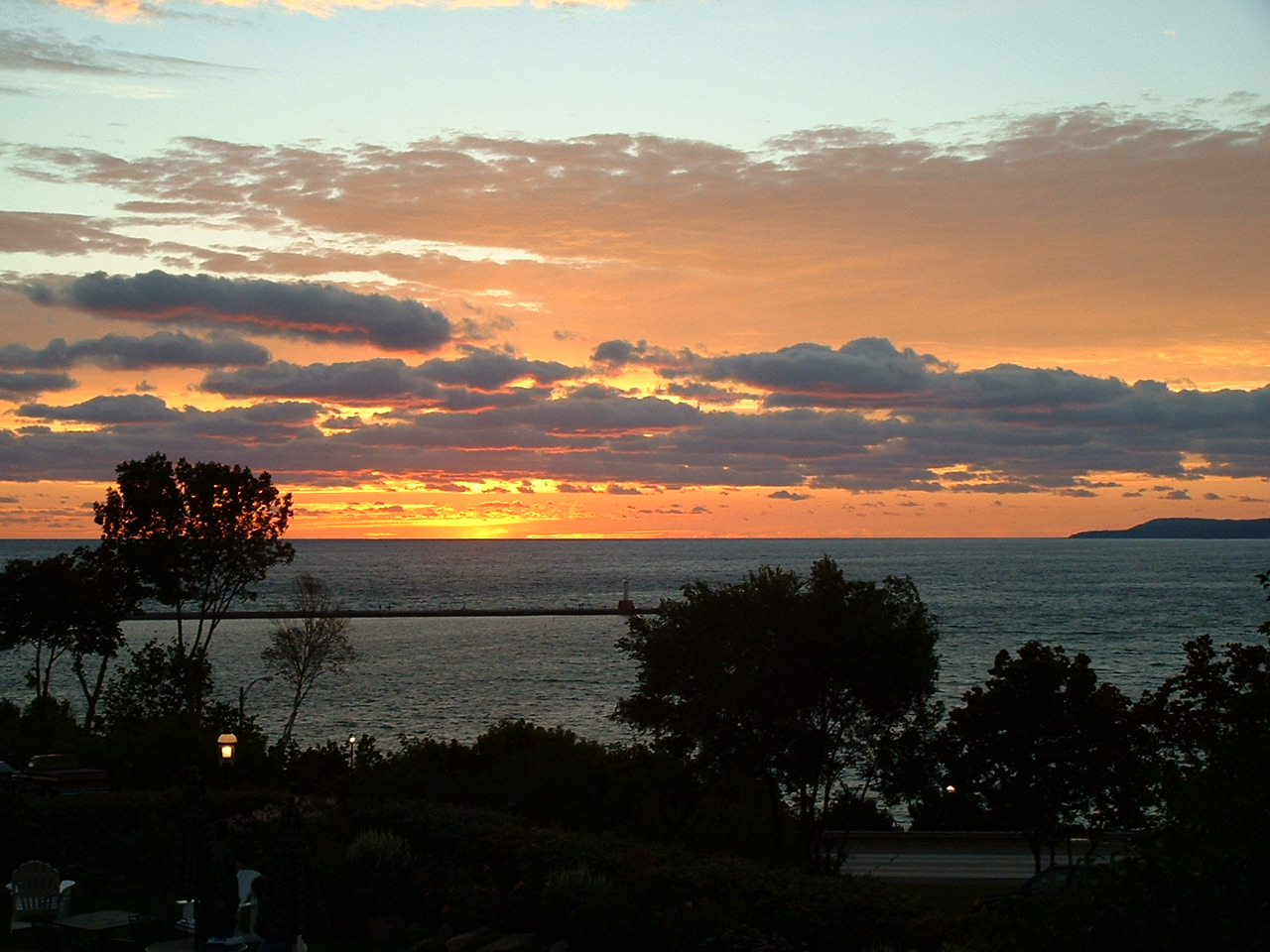
Little Traverse Bay at sunset, looking north from Petoskey

The Odawa, including Nissowaquet and around 180 warriors, moved to L'Arbre with the Jesuits in the summer of 1741 and they established a mission called Apatawaaing. L'Arbre Croche, also known by the Odawa name Waganagisi, was the largest settlement in the Great Lakes at the time. It encompassed much of present-day Emmet County, Michigan, with a number of villages along the shoreline from Fort Michilimackinac down to Little Traverse Bay. (Note: L'Arbre Croche covered a large area. Various descriptions placed it 20 miles (32 km) west of Fort Michilimackinac, 10 miles southwest of Mackinac, and at Harbor Springs. It is also said to have been a collection of 10 villages in 1819. All of which are correct.) Beauharnois sent French men from Michilimackinac to help til the soil. A church was built at Cross Village in 1742 by master carpenter Joseph Ainse. Du Jaunay split his time between the Sainte-Anne church and the Saint-Ignace at L’Arbre Croche mission in Cross Village, where he had a farm. He was assisted by several French priests and some Native American slaves.

The Odawa of L'Arbre Croche fished, hunted, and grew and gathered produce, including corn, squash, onions, cucumbers, turnips, cabbages, melon, and wild strawberries. The Odawa bartered with the French at Mackinac Island, a major fur-trading center where Lake Huron meets Lake Michigan. They traded food, bark, and canoes for good, like clothing and glass and porcelain beads. The canoes and food–including dried fish and meat and produce–supplied the fur traders who worked in the wilderness of the Great Lakes and the Upper Mississippi regions. In the fall, the Odawa moved south to the St. Joseph River and other rivers where they divided into family bands who hunted for furs. In the spring, they made maple sugar and headed back to L'Arbre Croche.

=== British rule (1763–1787) ===
Ojibwas of Michilimackinac attacked the now British fort (Treaty of Paris (1763)), in June 1763. They were led by Minweweh, who was staunchly loyal to the French. Surviving traders and soldiers were rescued and taken by Nissowaquet's warriors to L'Arbre Croche, where they were protected for a month. Nissowaquet was rewarded with a personal slave and a supply of trade goods. Some of the goods were used to purchase the captivity of captives from the Ojibwas. Nissowaquet brought refugees from the fort to the British in Montreal. He promised as good a relationship with the British as he had with the French. The British and the American governments did not support the mission and would not pay the salary for a priest after Du Jaunay's departure in 1765.

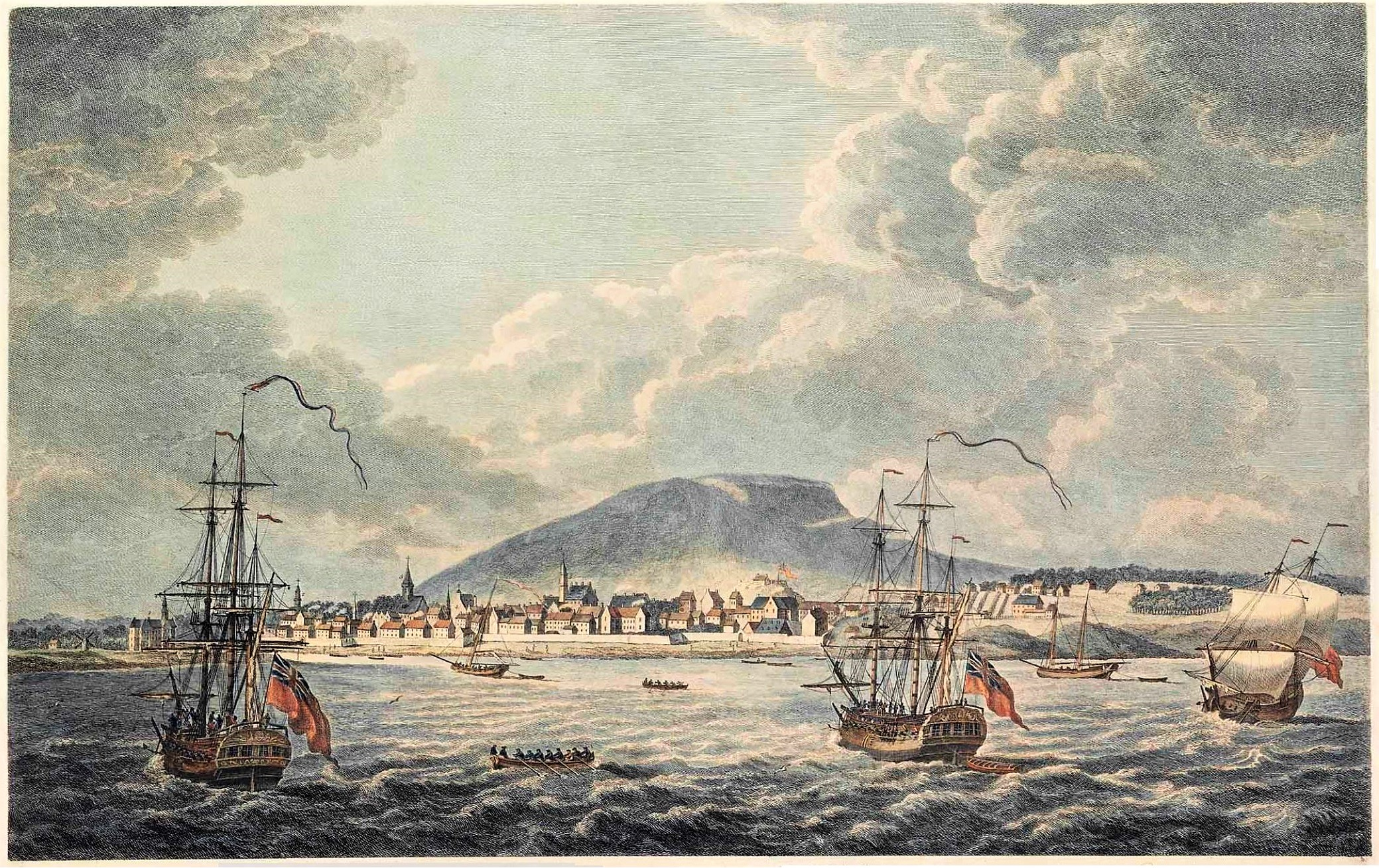
Montreal occupied following the French and Indian War, viewed from the East with Royal Navy vessels in the foreground

Beginning from the 1750s and lasting until the 1760s, a smallpox outbreak devastated several Indian communities throughout the American Midwest, including L'Arbre Croche. The outbreak was brought on in part by victorious Indian warriors who had fought on the side of the French bringing home prizes of war which had been infected with the disease; the Ojibwe, Odawa and Potawatomi peoples were most affected by the outbreak. An oral account recorded by Odawa tribal leader and historian Andrew Blackbird claimed that the outbreak had "entirely depopulated and laid waste" to L'Arbre Croche. (Note: Nissowaquet's biography states that the "devastating" smallpox epidemic occurred in 1757, following a French and Indian War battle at Fort George.) Blackbird wrote in his history that a group of Odawa were sold a tin box in Montreal, and were told the box contained something supernatural but that they were not to open it until they returned to their homeland. The box supposedly contained four or more nested boxes, until the final box which was one inch in size and contained moldy particles which were smallpox. According to the account, entire families of L'Arbre Croche died due to the outbreak and the population of the region was greatly reduced.

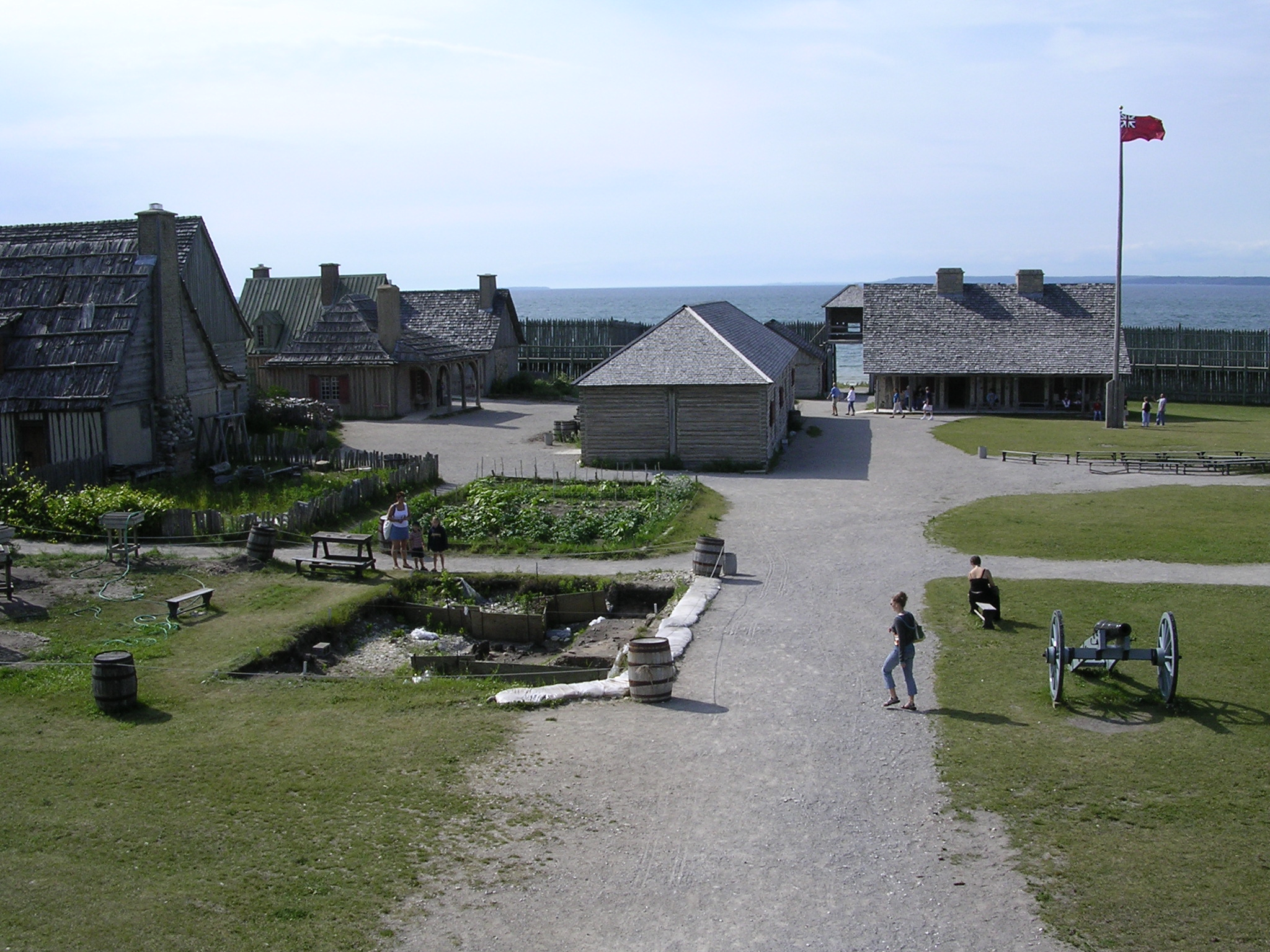
A photograph of Fort Michilimackinac in Mackinaw City, Michigan (taken on 9 July 2004)

Nissowaquet sided with the British during the American Revolutionary War (1775–1783) and participated in several expeditions with his warriors.

=== Northwest Territory (1787–1803) ===
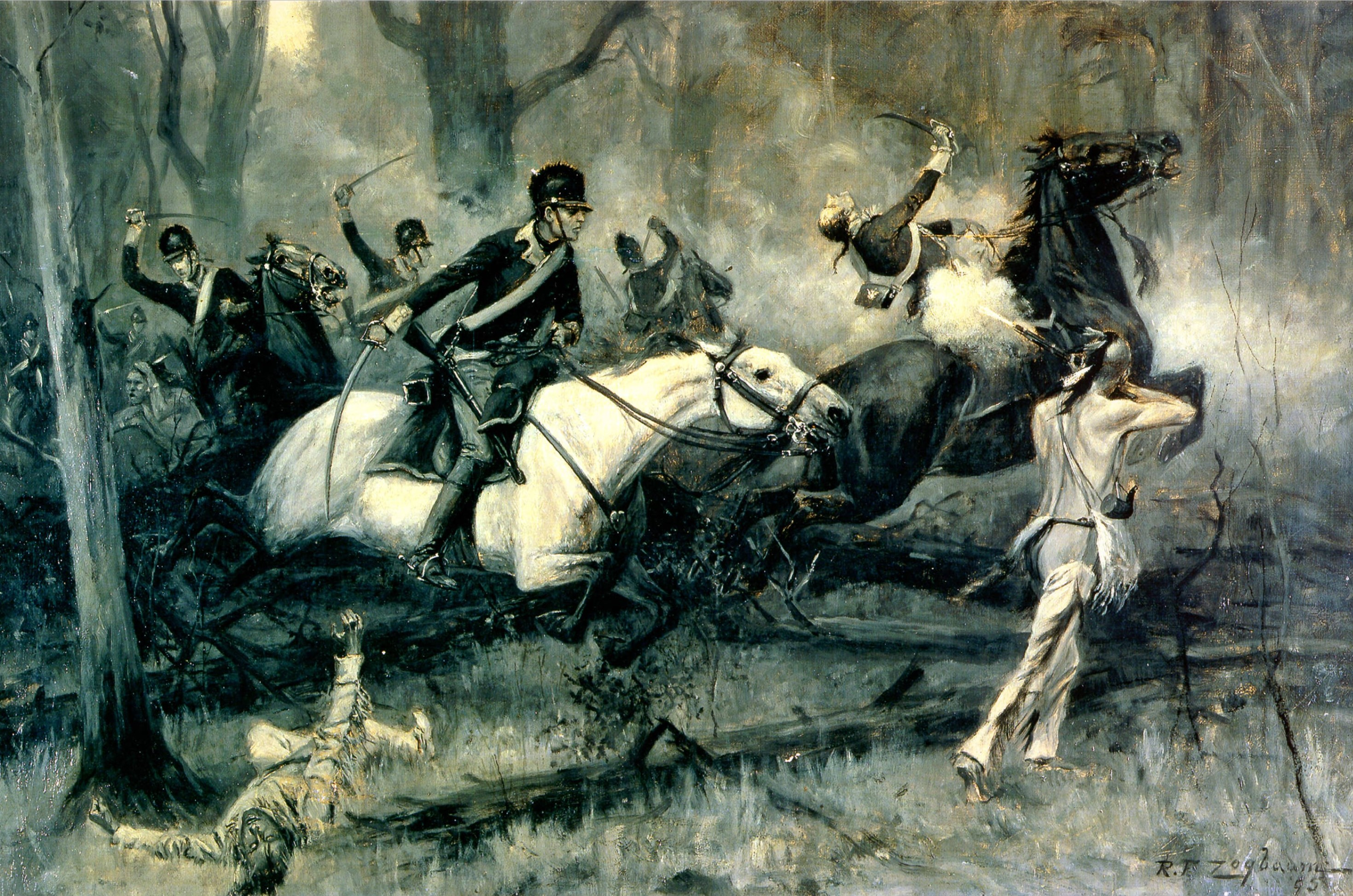
Charge of the Dragoons at Fallen Timbers by R. T. Zogbaum, 1895, Battle of Fallen Timbers

The Odawa and Ojibwa from northern Michigan fought with other Native Americans against the United States government at the Battle of Fallen Timbers in 1794. The indigenous people fought to protect their traditional lands from westward expansion. Having lost the battle, Mackinac Island went to the United States as negotiated in the Treaty of Greenville.

In 1799, Father Gabriel Richard, a Catholic missionary from Detroit, visited the Odawa at L'Arbre Croche. Soon after, a smallpox epidemic spread through the Great Lakes region. More than one-half of L'Arbre Croche settlement's residents died. The Odawa believed deaths were retributions, either because Richard's religion was evil or that the Great Spirit was angered by the possibility of the natives accepting Catholicism.

=== Michigan Territory (1805–1837) ===
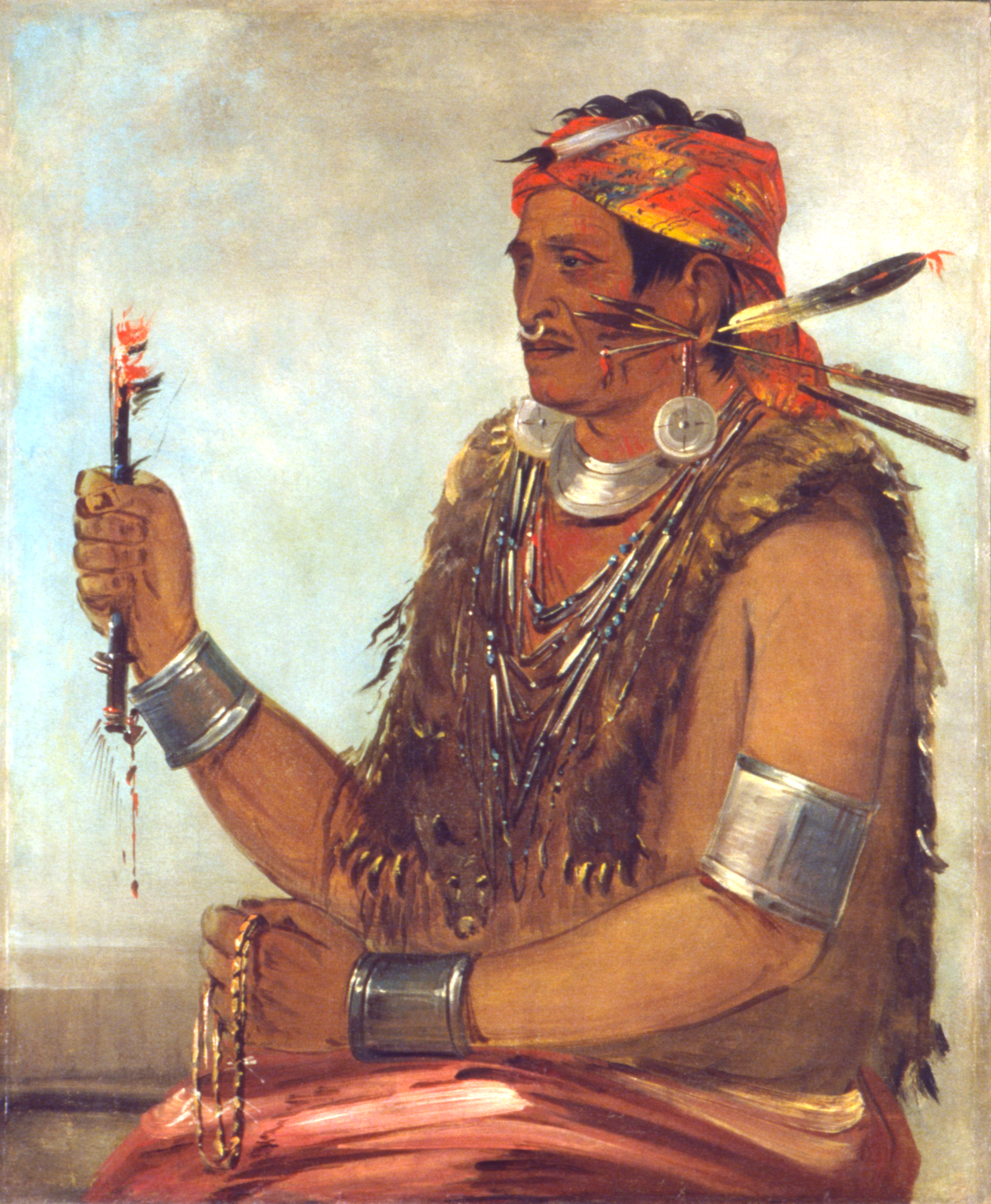
Tenskwatawa, also known as the Shawnee Prophet, by George Catlin, 1830

In 1807, an Odawa warrior named Le Maigouis, also known as The Trout, traveled from his home in L'Arbre Croche to Tenskwatawa's village in Ohio. Tenskwatawa, also called the Shawnee Prophet, founded a religion that Trout wished to learn more about. Trout returned to Michigan, where he successfully spread the religion to the Odawa and Ojibwa of L'Arbre Croche and the northern peninsula of Michigan. The prophet sought to effectuate "spiritual salvation and cultural renewal” by returning to traditional social ethics, including care for the widowed and respect for elders. He also called for giving up the ways of the white people, such as the use of alcohol, firearms, and European cookware. Another message was to hunt only the animals needed to feed and clothe the tribe, and not to provide food for the White fur traders, which would help restore the number of game in the region. The prophet's brother, Tecumseh helped spread the religion throughout the Great Lakes region.

Homelands of Anishinaabe and Oji-Cree, ca. 1800. The Ojibwe, Potawatomi and Odawa formed a loose confederation called the Council of Three Fires

By September 1807, the Odawa had stopped buying liquor at Michilimackinac. It had been a lucrative product and traders tried to regenerate demand by giving away gallons of alcohol, without any takers. In 1808, some of the converts moved to Tenskwatawa's village, Prophetstown, in present-day northwest Indiana. The settlement, however, was not able to support the number of arrivals. There was not sufficient farmland and the prophet disallowed trading for food with the Whites. As people starved, they resorted to eating their horses and then their dogs. More than 100 people from L'Arbre Croche died and the surviving disenchanted people returned to their homeland.

L'Arbre Croche was a collection of ten villages, with a population of 1500, in 1819. By 1820, between 1,000 and 1,200 Odawa lived in the Little Traverse Bay area of L'Arbre Croche. They lived in clusters of lodges along the shore of the bay.

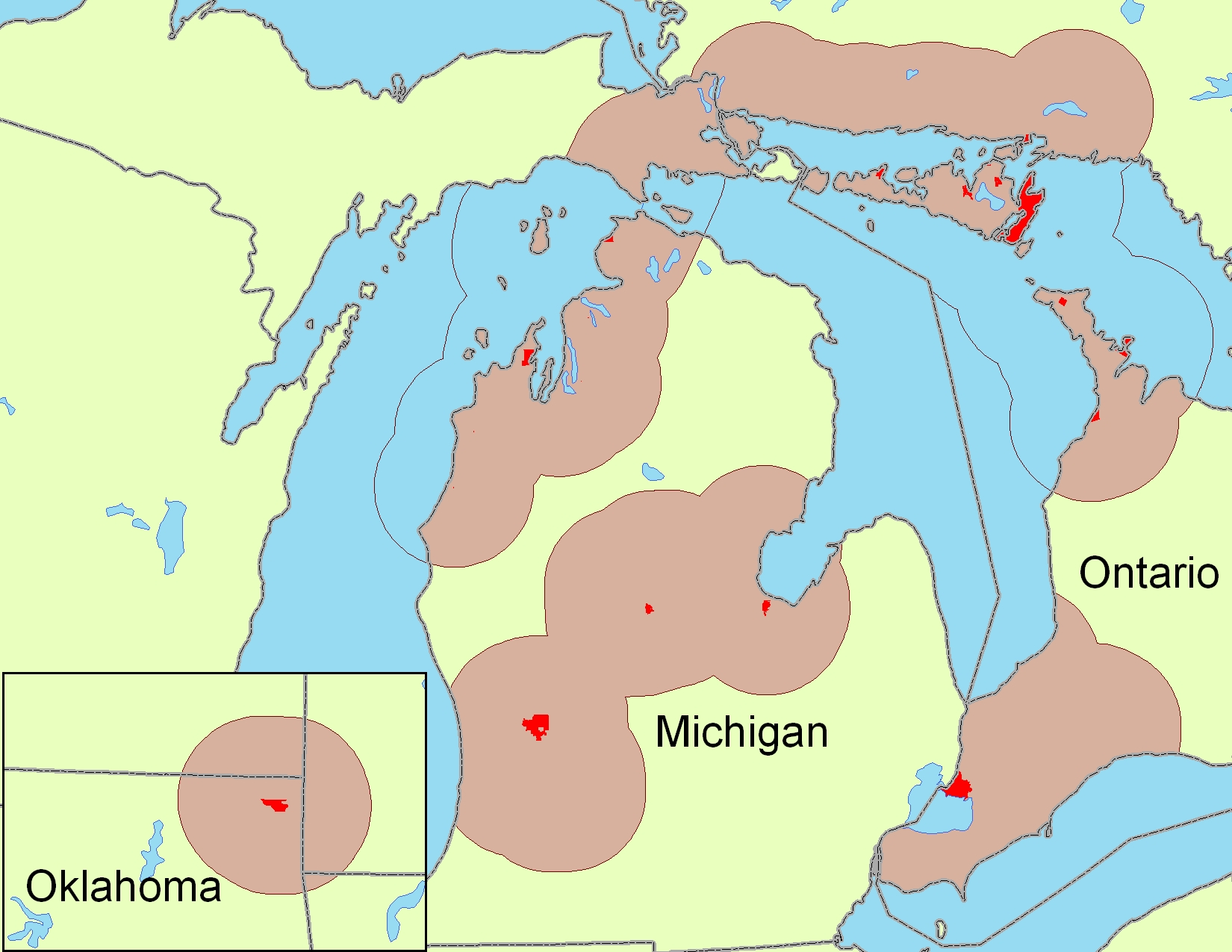
Odawa settlement areas

In 1825, the United States government granted funds for a Catholic priest. A log chapel, named after St. Vincent, was built in 1825. At that time, there were around 1,500 Odawa at L'Arbre Coche. Father Frederic Baraga came to Cross Village in 1831 and is credited with creating an Odawa language alphabet and dictionary and establishing a number of churches in the area. Bishop Baraga was later replaced by fellow Slovenian missionary priest Fr. Francis Xavier Pierz.

Native Americans in Michigan Territory (1805–1837) lost much of their land in the early 19th century. In 1836, the Odawa gave up land across most of the Eastern Upper Peninsula and Northern Lower Peninsula when they signed the Treaty of Washington. Chief Joseph Nowimashkote initiated a plan for the Odawa to buy back their land at Cross Village, also called La Croix in the 19th century. The village of Harbor Springs was established with a church, manse, a school, and the country's first temperance society. L'Arbre Croche was in the Roman Catholic Archdiocese of Cincinnati at the time.

A historical marker is located on the Tunnel of Trees Scenic Heritage Route on Michigan State Highway 119.

== Notable people ==
- Catherine Askin Robertson Hamilton
- John Askin Jr.
- Madeline Askin Richardson
- Andrew Blackbird
- Elizabeth Bertrand

== Bibliography ==
- Bedford-Jones, Henry; McGonnell, H.; Michigan and Wisconsin Historical Societies (1917). L'Arbre Croche mission. Santa Barbara: Sign of the Crossed Quills.
- Karamanski, Theodore J. (2012). Blackbird's song : Andrew J. Blackbird and the Odawa people. East Lansing: Michigan State University Press. ISBN 978-1-61186-050-4.
