= Elijah Brush =

American politician

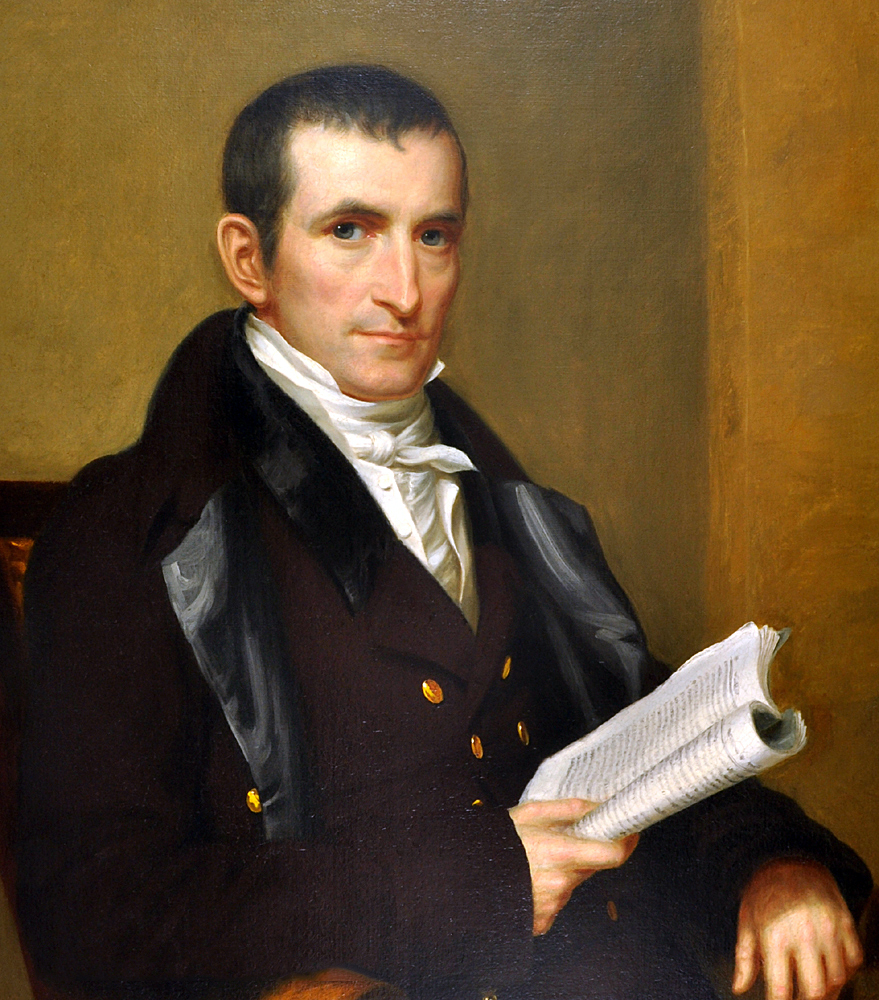
- portrait by Rembrandt Peale

2nd Mayor of Detroit, first charter
- In office 1806–1806
- Preceded by: Solomon Sibley
- Succeeded by: None; reincorporated

Personal details
- Born: May 10, 1773 Bennington, Vermont
- Died: December 14, 1813 (aged 40) Detroit, Michigan
- Spouse: Adelaide Askin (m. 1802–1813)
- Relations: John Askin (father-in-law)
- Parent(s): Nathaniel Brush; Samantha Parker Brush
- Education: Dartmouth College
- Profession: Lawyer

Elijah Brush (May 10, 1773 – December 14, 1813) was a lawyer and politician from Detroit, Michigan, United States.

== Early life ==
Elijah Brush was born in Bennington, Vermont in 1773, the son of Colonel Nathaniel Brush and Samantha Parker (d. 1789). Brush graduated from Dartmouth College and came to Detroit in 1798.

== Career ==
Following Detroit's hand-over to American control, John Askin, a British subject, moved across the Detroit River to Canada, leaving behind his farm, "Private Claim #1," which was immediately adjacent to Detroit.

=== Public service ===
Elijah Brush was elected a trustee in 1803, appointed Lieutenant Colonel of the Territorial Militia in 1805, and appointed as mayor of the town of Detroit after Solomon Sibley's resignation in 1806. Brush also served as Treasurer of the Michigan Territory from 1806 to 1813, and from 1811 to 1814 served as United States Attorney.

In 1807, Brush was the counsel in the first case to test the right to hold slaves in Michigan, Denison v. Tucker.

During the War of 1812, British forces captured Detroit and Elijah Brush and other militia officers were taken prisoner. He was shipped to Toronto, but his brother-in-law, a British officer, procured his release, and Brush returned to Detroit in late 1813 when American troops retook the city.

== Personal life ==
In 1802, Brush married Adelaide Askin (1783–1859), daughter of John Askin and sister of John Askin Jr., both prominent fur traders. The couple had three sons and a daughter who survived their father:

- Edmund Askin Brush (1802–1877), who married Elizabeth Cass Hunt (1825–1913).
- Charles Andrew Brush (1804–1807), who died young.
- Charles Reuben Brush (1807–1849), who married Jane Cameron Forsyth (1809–1856).
- John Alfred Brush (1811–1870), a doctor.
- Archange "Semanthe" Brush (1813–1842), who married Charles Meredith.

Elijah and Adelaide moved onto Askin's farm, and in 1806 the Brushes purchased it for $6000 and it eventually became known as the Brush Farm. Brush, a careful administrator, increased the value of the farm and made his heirs wealthy. In the 1850s, Edmund Brush began developing sections of the property into the fashionable Brush Park; the streets Edmund, Alfred, Adelaide, and Brush were named after members of the family.

He died on December 14, 1813, shortly after the Americans retook Detroit.

Political offices
Preceded by Solomon Sibley	Mayor of Detroit; 1806	Succeeded by Re-incorporation
