= John Askin =

- Born: 1739; Aughnacloy, Ireland
- Died: 1815 (aged 75–76); Sandwich, Upper Canada
- Occupations: Merchant, militia officer
- Spouse: Marie-Archange Barthe
- Children: Three children with Monette, an Odawa slave, and nine children with his wife Marie

Lieutenant-Colonel John Askin (1739 – 1815) was an Irish-born merchant and militia officer who was instrumental in the establishment of British rule in Upper Canada.

== Early years ==
John Askin was born in Aughnacloy, County Tyrone in 1739; his ancestors are believed to have originally lived in Scotland with the surname Erskine.

== Career ==
Askin came to North America as a sutler to the British Army in 1758. After the British conquest of New France, he entered the North American fur trade and operated a trading post at Fort Michilimackinac. In 1767, Askin started building a post at the Lake Superior end of Grand Portage which became operational the following year. Askin's post was among the first to establish Grand Portage as a major redistribution point on the fur trade to the Canadian Prairies and Athabaska country. In 1781, he formed a partnership with Robert Hamilton’s son Alexander and Richard Cartwright; Askin was based in Detroit. From 1786 to 1789, he was part of a group of trading companies known as the Miamis Company. He was also involved in a shipping business and land speculation; he was one of the partners involved in the Cuyahoga Purchase along the south shore of Lake Erie. In 1789, he was named justice of the peace at Detroit. When Detroit was turned over to the United States in 1796, he became a justice of the peace for the Western District and moved to Sandwich, now Windsor Ontario, in 1802. Askin was connected to the Family Compact through a number of business and social ties, particularly associating with James McGill, who underwrote much of his debt. Through these connections, he assumed a number of political roles, including lieutenant-colonel for the local militia, member of the Land Board of Hesse, and local magistrate.

In 1795, Askin was part of a partnership with Ebenezer Allen and Charles Whitney of Vermont, Robert Randall of Philadelphia and several other British subjects in Detroit including William Robertson, which planned to buy the entire lower Michigan peninsula from the United States government.

Following the transfer of Fort Detroit by the British in 1796, Askin abandoned his farm, Private Claim # 1, which was acquired by Elijah Brush whom later served as Mayor of Detroit. Concession 2 lot 14, Barton Township; where present day Hamilton, Ontario is, was part of the original Crown Grant to Askin on July 10, 1801. He sold it to Nathaniel Hughson Sr., who sold it to James Durand around 1806. Askin was also a lieutenant colonel in the Canadian Militia. In 1805, Askin wrote to personal friend Colonel Arent DePeyster about his role in the militia: "On[c]e a year, I put on my best Cloths & as Colonel Commands the Militia... make them Fire in Honor to the best of Kings. If we dont all Fire at once thats no matter... a Drink generally closes the Scene."

== Slaves and personal life ==
John Askin owned eight enslaved people in Michigan. He owned an Odawa woman named Monette or Manette when he lived in Michilimackinac. They had three children, John, Catherine, and Madeline. He freed Monette in 1766. Askin bought and sold Native American and African American slaves. He also had one indentured servant.

John Askin actively sought to procure attractive Native American female slave children to satisfy either his personal needs or to satisfy the needs of his clients. In a May 18, 1778 letter to a trader contact at the French trading post in Michilimackinac, he writes "I shall need two pretty panis girls from 9 to 16 years of age. Please speak to these gentlemen to get them for me."

He married Marie-Archange Barthe, after June 21, 1772, when he contracted to marry her. He had an additional nine children with his wife, and treated his children all the same, including providing them with a good education. Askin died at Sandwich in 1815. His son-in-law, Elijah Brush inherited his American farm and enslaved people.

According to Marcel Trudel, Askin owned 23 slaves during his life.
