= John Askin Jr. =

- Born: c. 1765; L'Arbre Croche
- Died: 1 January 1820
- Occupation: Merchant
- Spouse: Madelaine Askin
- Parent(s): John Askin and Monette

John Askin Jr. (c. 1765 – 1 January 1820) was a British Indian Department officer and merchant active in Upper Canada and Michigan. He and his wife, Madelaine, are remembered as being instrumental in the invention of the Mackinaw jacket in 1811.

== Early life ==
John Askin was born in c. 1765 in L'Arbre Croche. He was the son of Irish-born fur trader John Askin and his First Nations slave Monette. Like his father, John Askin Jr. was loyal to the British crown during a twenty-year period, from 1794 until 1815, as the allegiance of the Upper Great Lakes was being strongly contested between Great Britain and the young United States. Many First Nations were allied with the British, and the junior Askin joined them and fought against U.S. forces at the Battle of Fallen Timbers in 1794. Askin tried to rally and advise the beaten Native Americans, but was subjected by the victorious U.S. commander, Anthony Wayne, to administrative detention. While Askin was detained, Wayne and the defeated Native Americans signed the Treaty of Greenville, relinquishing to the Americans much of the future state of Ohio.

== Removal to Canada ==
In line with the diminished status of the British on the Upper Great Lakes after the Treaty of Greenville and Jay's Treaty, young Askin retired to the Canadian side of what was becoming an international boundary. He accepted the King's appointment as collector of customs at Amherstburg, Upper Canada, in 1801, and accepted further appointment as storekeeper for the Indian Department at Fort St. Joseph on St. Joseph Island in 1807. In the latter post, he took the substantial career risk of issuing more than forty heavyweight Hudson's Bay point blankets in November 1811 to the fort's impecunious commander, Captain Charles Roberts, accepting a scrip warrant in payment. John's wife, Madelaine, and the other women of the fort sewed the blankets into the first Mackinaw jackets, which British Army soldiers used as greatcoats for winter fatigue duty.

== War of 1812 ==
John Askin Jr. redoubled his connection to Roberts and the British cause in the following year upon the outbreak of the War of 1812. As a key fur trader at Fort St. Joseph with kinship connections to local First Nations peoples, he led the recruitment of approximately 300 tribal warriors to join the much smaller Fort St. Joseph British garrison in its expedition against a United States strong point, Fort Mackinac. As a civilian interpreter, Askin accompanied Roberts' expedition to British Landing. The warriors recruited by Askin helped to sharply outnumber the 61 Americans present for duty, who were forced to surrender the fort without a shot.

To Askin's disappointment, the British home country did not follow up on this victory. Its government signed a treaty in 1814 to restore the pre-1812 border. John Askin Jr. died in British Canada on January 1, 1820. His son, John Baptist Askin, born in 1788, became a prominent resident and community leader in London, Ontario.
