= Lisette Denison Forth =

American slave turned philanthropist

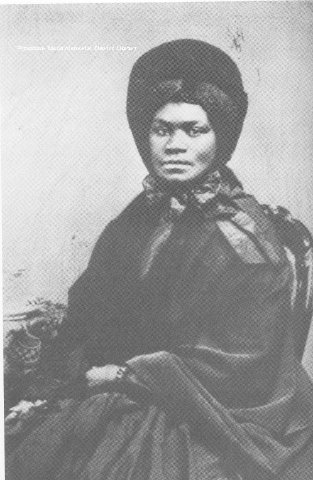
- Daguerreotype of Lisette Denison Forth
- Born: c. 1786; Detroit, Michigan
- Died: August 7, 1866 (aged 79–80); Grosse Ile, Michigan
- Occupations: landowner and philanthropist

Elizabeth Denison Forth (c. 1786 – August 7, 1866) was an African-American landowner and philanthropist from Michigan. Forth was born enslaved, and worked as a maid before becoming a landowner. She was inducted into the Michigan Women's Hall of Fame in 2017.

== Early life ==
Forth was born with slave status in 1786 near Detroit, the second of Peter and Hannah Denison's six children. Her family was enslaved by William and Catherine Tucker; her father worked on the Tucker family farm and her mother worked in the house. When William Tucker died in 1805, he specified that Peter and Hannah Denison would be freed after Catherine Tucker's death, but willed the Denison children to his brother. The next year, Peter and Hannah Denison were freed and went to work for Elijah Brush, who encouraged them to sue for the freedom of their children under the Northwest Ordinance, which prohibited slavery in the territory. In 1807, the Michigan Supreme Court heard the case, but ruled that only the youngest of the children, born after the Northwest Ordinance took effect, could be freed.

Soon afterward, Judge Augustus B. Woodward ruled that the Michigan Territory had no obligation to return enslaved people who had been freed by establishing residence in Canada to slavery. Following this legal precedent, Lisette and her brother crossed into Canada shortly afterward to establish residency and gain their freedom.

== Freedom ==
The two Denisons returned to Detroit in approximately 1815. Lisette became a domestic servant, working for Solomon Sibley in the 1820s. She had a close relationship with her employers, and invested her pay in land. In 1825, she purchased four lots in Pontiac, Michigan, becoming the first Black property owner in the city. However, she never lived in the city, leasing the lots to her brother Scipio and eventually selling them in 1836/37. The property now forms part of Oak Hill Cemetery, and a state of Michigan historical marker commemorates her ownership.

In 1827, Lisette married Scipio Forth, the owner of a freight business; however, he died three years later.

In 1831, Lisette was employed by the household of John Biddle, mayor of Detroit and founder of Wyandotte, Michigan. She continued to invest, buying stock in a steamboat and bank, and in 1837 a lot in Detroit. Lisette spent much of her time at Biddle's Wyandotte estate, eventually following the Biddles to Philadelphia in 1849. By 1854 she was back in Detroit, living in her own home at a lot located at what is now 328 Macomb Street (the site is designated a state of Michigan Historic Site). The Biddles asked her to come to Paris to tend to the ailing Eliza, Biddle's wife. As before, Lisette had good relationships with her employers and had become good friends with Eliza Biddle; the two women, both Episcopalians, made a vow to eventually build a chapel.

Lisette returned to Michigan in 1856, entering the employ of John Biddle's son, William S. Biddle, at his estate on Grosse Ile, an exclusively white upper-class community. She died on August 7, 1866 (shortly after Eliza Biddle's death), and is interred in Elmwood Cemetery.

== St. James Episcopal Church ==
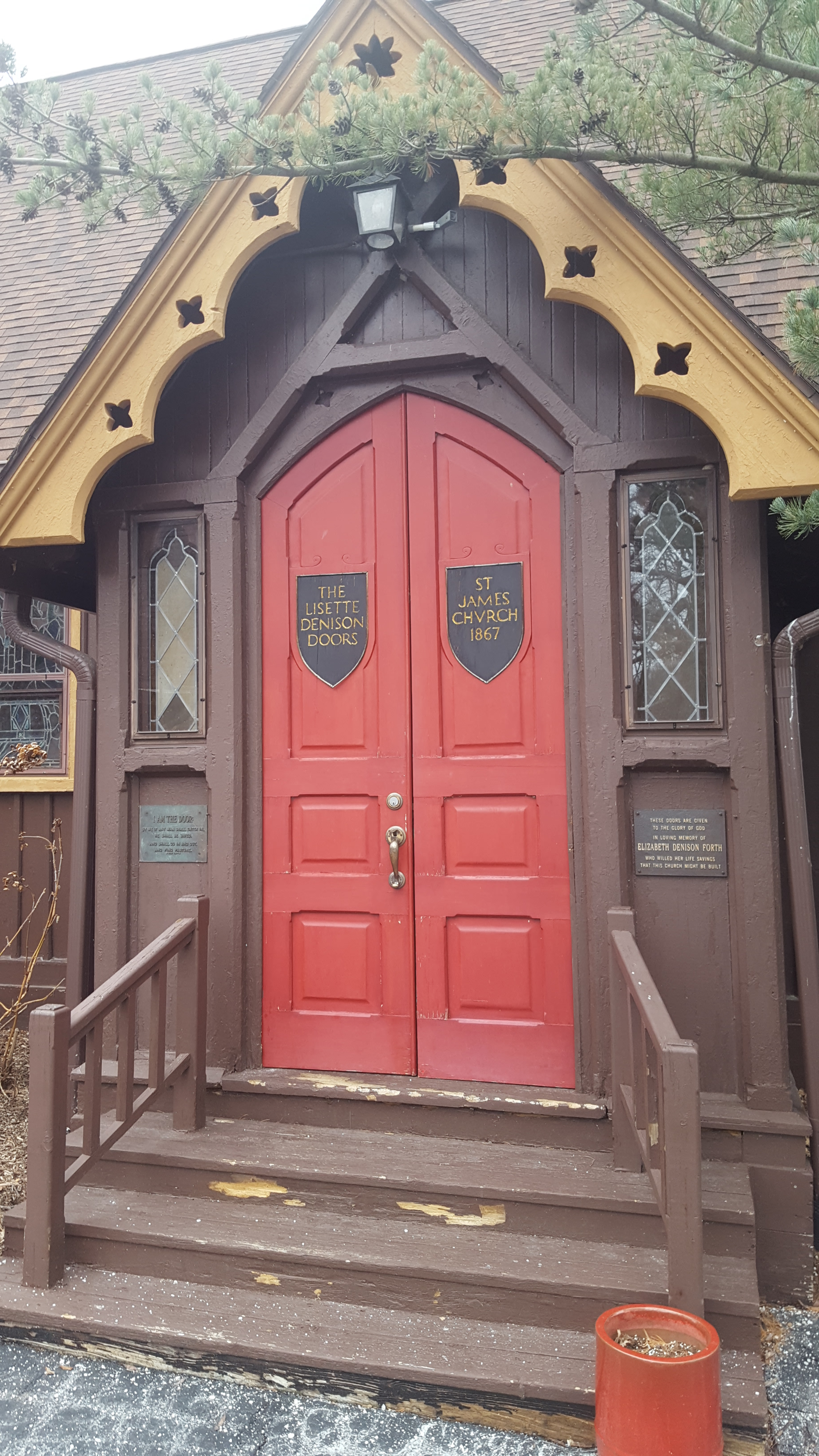
Main entrance doors dedicated to Lisette Denison Forth

When Forth died, she willed a portion of her estate to her family and the rest, some $3,000, to be used to construct a church. Although Lisette's contribution provided the bulk of the funds, William Biddle, knowing his mother's wishes, supplemented Lisette's contribution with some of his own and some of his mother's money. William's brother James donated the land for the chapel, and the two hired architect Gordon W. Lloyd to design the structure. James Biddle also built an altar cross, and a kneeling bench and reading stand for the minister. Construction began in 1867 and was completed in 1868. The first services in the church, conducted by Rev. Moses Hunter, were held in the spring of 1868.

Bishop Samuel Allen McCoskry consecrated the church in July 1868; in his later report to the diocese, he stated:

This church is the fruit of a life of toil and service of a faithful colored servant of Christ. She had, for years, husbanded her earnings for this purpose, and, long before she was called away from her life of probation, had solemnly devoted them to the Church of Christ. This was done in connection with the design of one, whom she had, long and faithfully served, to unite with her in the holy act. Providential circumstances having prevented the accomplishment of the wish of this person, it was faithfully carried out by two of her sons, who liberally supplied the funds required to complete the church; and it now stands, in all its simplicity and beauty, as the joint act of a Christian household, to provide a house of prayer for the rich and poor.

The church's red doors are dedicated to Forth, and a state of Michigan historical marker located on the site commemorates both the church and Forth.
