= Monette (slave) =

Monette, also known as Manette (fl. 1760s), was a Native American woman enslaved by John Askin. She gave birth to three children. These children were educated and married into prominent families of the Great Lakes regions of present-day Michigan and Ontario, Canada. Her son was John Askin Jr. Her daughter Catherine married Captain Samuel Robertson, who operated one of Askin's boats, and was married a second time to Robert Hamilton, founder of Queenston, Ontario. Her daughter Madeline was married to Dr. Robert Richardson, the surgeon of the Queen's Rangers stationed at Fort George.

== Enslaved to John Askin ==
Monette was purchased from René Bourassa by John Askin for 50 pounds (equivalent to £8,888 in 2025). (Note: Manette is a diminutive form of the name Marianne. On September 8, 1748, Marianne was baptized, and her godfather was recorded as René Bourassa. She was also identified as his Panis (slave). Marianne gave birth to a child named Basile in 1750, whose godparents were René Bourassa and his wife. Baptized by Bourassa, Monette became affiliated with her enslaver-godfather's family that include the French and Native American families of the Blondeaus, the Chevaliers, and Charles Michel de Langlade.) The sale took place before 1762 at the Straits of Mackinac, a trading center. One of Monette and Askin's son-in-law states in a letter that his Native American mother-in-law was an enslaved Pawanee who was captured in war. She was described as a Panis, enslaved people for Seneca people and other warring tribes affiliated with the French. Monette was one of several indigenous and Black people enslaved by Askin. He also had a contract with at least one indentured servant.

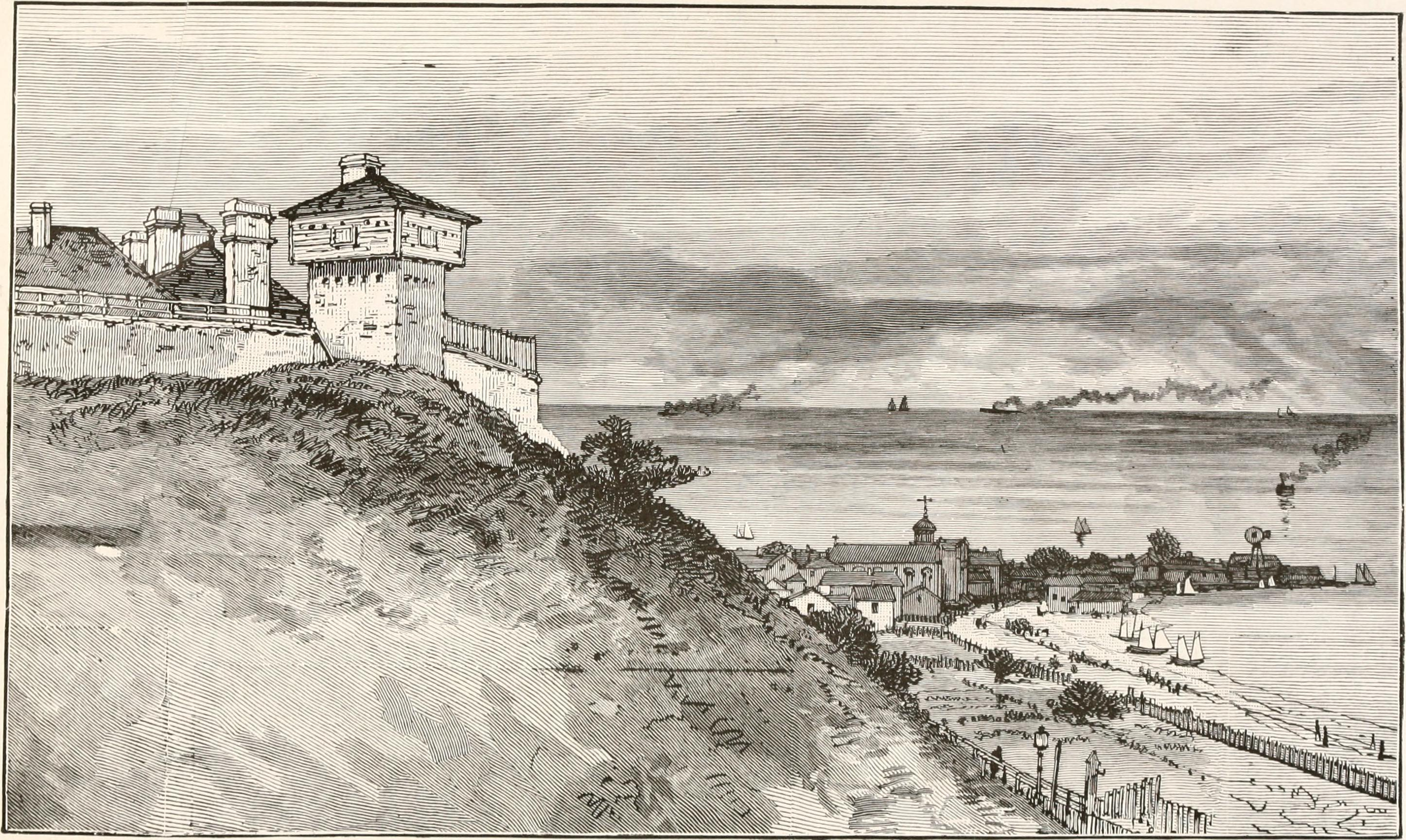
Fort Michilimackinac

Monette lived with Askin at L'Arbre Croche, a key Odawa village in Michigan. Located overlooking Lake Michigan, it was about 20 miles (32 km) east of Fort Michilimackinac where her husband operated his fur trading business. Askin's purchase of Monette helped him develop relationships with Native Americans who knew her. It was common for traders to have children with Native American women to develop connections with their tribes. According to Milo M. Quaife, "known facts concerning Askin's character during his long career are such as to give assurance that his treatment of her [Monette] was both honorable and kind, judged by the standards of his time and environment."

Askin enslaved eight people. Generally, fur traders used enslaved people to handle furs, grow food, cook, and clean. (Note: Askin had a garden at Michilimackinac by 1774, which was difficult to manage due to the poor quality of the soil, cool climate, and strong winds. He grew lettuce, onions, barley, parsley, potatoes, and beets.) They also took Native American enslaved women as partners and companions.

Monette was manumitted on September 9, 1766, at Detroit. (Note: Manette's manumission was recorded in Early Land Transfers: Detroit and Wayne Country, Michigan, 1703 – 1796, vol. A, B, C. Louisa St. Clair Chapter, Daughters of the American Revolution, 1936, 9.) Askin moved to Detroit by 1781.

== Children ==
As an enslaved woman, Monette was subject to serial rape, which resulted in the births of two daughters and a son. John Askin, Jr. was born at L'Arbre Croche in early 1762, Charlotte was born in late 1762, and Madeline was born in 1764. Monette's children were treated well by Askin, grew up free, and were educated. They all entered into marriages. Monette's children had nine half-siblings through Askin's marriage in 1772 to Marie Archange Barthe. She was the daughter of Charles Barthe, a successful merchant.

=== John Askin Jr. ===
Around 1772, John Askin Jr. was sent to be educated by his trading associates. His care and education were overseen by Robert Ellices of Phyn and Ellice, who enrolled him in a school in Schenectady, New York. He was an apprentice in the trading business in New York and Montreal. John Jr. was schooled in Montreal by 1778 when Askin asked for his son to be returned to begin to work for him. His education, apprenticeships, Native American heritage, and ability to speak Native American languages made him a valuable trader. In 1801, John Jr. became a collector of customs in Amherstburg, Upper Canada, and six years later, he worked at St. Joseph Island, for the Indian Department.

=== Catherine Askin Robertson Hamilton ===
Catherine, nicknamed Kitty, was educated at a convent of Congrégation de Notre Dame in Montreal. She married Captain Samuel Robertson, who operated one of Askin's boats, and was married a second time to Robert Hamilton, founder of Queenston. The Hamiltons lived in a mansion in Queenston and sent their children to school in Scotland. Catherine died of consumption in December 1796.

=== Madeline Askin Richardson ===
Madeline, born in L'Arbre Croche, was educated at the Congrégation de Notre Dame in Montreal. She visited her sister Catherine in the winter of 1793, where she met and married Dr. Robert Richardson, who was a surgeon of the Queen's Rangers at Fort George. Her son John Richardson was born October 4, 1796, in Queenston at his aunt Catherine's residence or at Fort George. The family was stationed two years later at Fort Erie and were then at York, Ontario and Fort Joseph, which was located in the northern frontier of Upper Canada. Their son John went to live with John Askin and his wife Marie in Detroit, where he was cared for and educated. John returned to his parents when they were moved to Amherstburg when Dr. Richardson was posted at Fort Malden, where their son Robert was born. John received a good education at Amherstburg, having studied Latin and Euclid, but was subject to bullying. Madeline traveled by boat or horse-drawn sleighs or vehicles to visit the Askins, who lived about 20 miles away at Strabane, where John Askin lived on the Canadian side of the Detroit River after 1783. The Strabane mansion was named after John Askin's birthplace in Ireland. Madeline died of consumption in January 1811. Soon afterward, her ninth child also died of the disease.

== Bibliography ==
- Beasley, David R. (2004). The Canadian Don Quixote: The Life and Works of Major John Richardson, Canada's First Novelist. David Beasley. pp. 1–2. ISBN 978-0-915317-18-9.
