= Raudot Ordinance of 1709 =

The Raudot Ordinance of 1709 was a law in the French colony of New France that legalized slavery.

On April 13, 1709, New France intendant Jacques Raudot passed the Ordinance Rendered on the Subject of the Negroes and the Savages Called Panis, legalizing the purchase and possession of indigenous slaves in New France.

"Having good knowledge of how this colony would benefit if it were possible for the inhabitants to purchase slaves known as panis, whose nation is Distant from this country [...] We for the great pleasure of his Majesty, ordain that all Panis and Negroes who have been purchased or who will be purchased at some time, will belong to Those who have purchased them."

== Context ==
When Raudot pronounced indigenous slavery to be legal in New France, the practice had already been well established in the Native and French alliances throughout the seventeenth and eighteenth centuries.

In all of the Indigenous societies the French encountered in North America, the basis of social relationships was kinship. This system allowed for alliances to transcend ethnic and linguistic lines, thereby explaining early Franco-Native relationships.

Indigenous slavery prior to contact with Europeans took the form of captivity raids on enemy territory with an objective to kill or capture members of the enemy nation—usually men were killed, while women and children were taken captive. Among the Northeastern communities, the death of a kin member decreased the spiritual power of the community. In order to reestablish spiritual balance, members of enemy nations would be taken captive, then either killed or adopted and made slaves. Captives who escaped death but were not adopted into their captors’ community, were then used as instruments of diplomacy.

In contrast to European slavery, the Indigenous practice focused more on the act of enslavement itself than on the production of commodities. In Bonds of Alliance, historian Brett Rushforth argues that Indigenous slavery was: "at its heart a system of symbiotic dominion, appropriating the power and productivity of enemies and facilitating the creation of friendships built on shared animosity toward the captive’s people". Thus, Indigenous slavery was part of a much larger social phenomena that focused more on the symbolic display of power and the building of alliances, than on the economic value of the labour.

At the turn of the eighteenth century, New France's major export was fur, which was, historian James Pritchard argues, obtained through "a symbiotic relationship between native hunters and French traders" which "gave rise to a set of socioeconomic and politicomilitary relations in the late seventeenth and early eighteenth centuries that became unique in the Western Hemisphere". These relations, coupled with a dogged westward drive towards the Pays d'en Haut, resulted in the French involvement in the Indigenous slave trade".

When Raudot published the 1709 ordinance, Indigenous slavery in New France had been playing an active role in mediating and consolidating Indigenous alliances, as well as meeting the settler demand for slave labour as pronounced by Raudot—"the people of the Panis nation are needed by the inhabitants of this country for agriculture and other enterprises that might be undertaken, like Negroes in the Islands, and as these bonds are very important to this colony, it is necessary to guarantee ownership to those who have bought or will buy them". It is within this context of economic crisis driven by the decreasing price of fur in the French market and a growing state debt that Raudot looked towards the Lesser Antilles—"The demographic and economic heart of French America"—for economic inspiration. Hoping to recreate a plantation style economy in New France, while responding to the inevitable inflow of Indigenous slaves from their Native allies, Raudot thereby confirmed the legality of Indigenous slavery in New France in the 1709 Ordinance.

=== After the Ordinance ===
After the 1709 Ordinance came into effect, slavery in the colony grew exponentially. Natives flooded the slave market in the course of intense diplomacy with the French to prevent colonial encroachment of Native land. Therefore, the flood of Native slaves in the St. Lawrence largely came from their Western counterparts. According to Rushforth, "by narrowing the target to a specific set of victims known as the ‘Panis nation,’ Raudot and his successors created a North American counterpart to the African kingdom of Nigritie: a distant and populous nation at war with more proximate allies, poorly understood but clearly identified as legally and morally enslavable". Effectively, this meant Western Natives were strengthening future adversaries in the east, with their own slaves, in a struggle to preserve their land.
