= Panis (slaves) =

Slaves of First Nation descent in Canada

Panis was a term used for slaves of the First Nations descent in Canada, a region of New France. First Nation slaves were generally called Panis (anglicized to Pawnee), with most slaves of First Nations descent having originated from Pawnee tribes. The term later became synonymous with "Indian slave" in the French colony, with a slave from any tribe being called Panis.

== Etymology ==
As early as 1670, a reference was recorded to a Panis in Montreal. The term is widely described as a corruption of the name of the Panismahas, a sub-tribe of the Pawnee people encountered in the Illinois Country, then a remote part of New France.

In the middle of the 17th century the Pawnees were being savagely raided by eastern tribes that had obtained metal weapons from the French, which gave them a terrible advantage over Indians who had only weapons of wood, flint, and bone. The raiders carried off such great numbers of Pawnees into slavery, that in the country on and east of the upper Mississippi the name Pani developed a new meaning: slave. The French adopted this meaning, and Indian slaves, no matter from which tribe they had been taken, were presently being termed Panis. It was at this period, after the middle of the 17th century, that the name was introduced into New Mexico in the form Panana by bands of mounted Apaches who brought large numbers of Pawnee slaves to trade to the Spaniards and Pueblo Indians.^{:24}

Raiders primarily targeted women and children, to be sold as slaves. In 1694, Apaches brought a large number of captive children to the trading fair in New Mexico, but for some reason there were not enough buyers, so the Apaches beheaded all their slaves in full view of the Spaniards.^{:46}

== History ==
Slavery of First Nations in the colony of New France was formalized through colonial law in 1709, with the passage of the Ordinance Rendered on the Subject of the Negroes and the Savages called Panis. Slaves of First Nations descent were only permitted to be enslaved while within the colony, although in practice enslaved individuals remained enslaved regardless of where they travelled. In 1747, the colonial administration proposed permitting the trade of First Nations slaves for slaves of African descent. However, these attempts were quashed by the French government, fearing it would jeopardize existing Franco-First Nations alliances.

By 1757 Louis Antoine de Bougainville considered that the Panis nation "plays ... the same role in America that the Negroes do in Europe." However, the importation of slaves of First Nations descent began to decline in the decade prior to the Conquest of New France in 1760. A number of New French institutions, including the enslavement of First Nations, continued to be legal as stipulated in the Articles of Capitulation of Montreal. By the late-18th century, slaves of African descent began to make up a larger portion of slaves being imported into the region by European slave traders.

Several court decisions, and legislative acts passed in the Canadas during the late-18th and early 19th century resulted in the decline of the institution in the colonies. The last slave of First Nations descent in Lower Canada was recorded to have been donated to a Montreal hospital in 1821. The institution was abolished in 1834; at which time, the majority of the slaves in the region were of African descent.

== Number enslaved ==
Origin of First Nation slaves in French Canada
Pawnees	Others from west of Mississippi	From the North	From the Great Lakes	From the West	Unknown origin	Sum
1,684	98	43	167	83	397	2,472

According to the Canadian Museum of History 35 individuals were held as slaves in Canada from the establishment of New France to 1699. Most of these individuals were slaves of First Nations origin. From 1700 to 1760 the museum estimated 2,000 slaves were held in Canada; two-thirds of whom were First Nations people. The museum reported most slaves were very young, that the average age of First Nations slaves was just 14 years old. Their mortality was high, as most came from the interior, and lacked immunity to European diseases.

From the mid-17th century to the abolition of slavery in 1833, there were approximately 2,683 slaves of First Nations descent; making up nearly two-thirds of all slaves in New France during the period of French colonial rule.

Monette (fl. 1760s), described as a Panis, was enslaved by fur trader John Askin and was the mother to John Askin Jr.; Catherine, the wife of Robert Hamilton, founder of Queenston; and Madeline, the wife of Dr. Robert Richardson of the Queen's Rangers.

== See also ==
- Slavery in Canada
- Slavery in New France
