= Redemptioner =

European indentured labourers

Redemptioners were European immigrants, generally in the 18th or early 19th century, who gained passage to the American Colonies (most often Pennsylvania) by selling themselves into indentured servitude, to pay back the shipping company which had advanced the cost of their transatlantic voyage. British indentured servants generally did not arrive as redemptioners, after the early colonial period, due to certain protections afforded to them by law. Redemptioners were at a disadvantage because they negotiated their indentures upon their arrival in America, after a long and difficult voyage, with no prospect to return to their homelands.

== History ==
Up until the American Revolutionary War, some convicts from the United Kingdom were transported to the American Colonies and served out their time as indentured servants before receiving an official pardon. Labor was in demand in Colonial America, and so free persons were also recruited. Those who could not afford to pay their own way came under indentures which obligated them to work for no wages, until their land and sea transportation and other expenses had been covered. Because of abuse of the system, which included lying to recruits and even shanghaiing them, the British Parliament enacted laws protecting British subjects from the worst abuses. The law required that the specific terms and conditions of servitude be approved by a magistrate in Great Britain, and that any indentures not bearing a magistrate's seal were unenforceable in the colonies. This resulted in British indentured servants becoming less attractive to potential colonial masters. A similar law was passed in Ireland, in an act of Parliament, whereby, in return for passage to America, the servant gave the purchaser of his indenture all rights to his labour for an agreed period of time, usually four years. Once a candidate for indentured servitude was identified, the emigration agent or visiting ship captain negotiated a binding contract detailing the terms and benefits, and the contract was presented before a local magistrate.

Non-British immigrants had no such protections. If they used the redemptioner system, they were forced to negotiate their indentures with their future master at the worst possible time, before they were allowed to leave a stinking, vermin-infested ship, at the end of a long voyage.

A few early 18th-century German-speaking colonists later sent for family members, back in the old world, by agreeing with the shipping companies to "redeem" their loved ones off the arriving vessel by paying the passage—more or less a form of COD for human cargo. Ships' owners soon saw this as a lucrative opportunity. They recruited Europeans to emigrate without payment up front, and allowed anyone in the American Colonies to redeem the travelers. The fare was set by the shipping company and the prospective master bargained directly with the immigrant to determine how many years he or she would work to pay off the "loan" of the fare.

To fill empty holds, poor Europeans were recruited onto ships in Rotterdam by “Neulaenders” (aka Neulander), or “newlanders,” who were already living in America, but had returned to Europe to pick up some possessions, or family members, to take back to America. Neulaenders received a commission for each person they brought to the ships at the harbor, including the ship that they were going to return to America on. Therefore, they were not always a trustworthy source of information about how the program would work for the emigrant. The Neulaenders were dressed in fancy clothes, in order to impress the peasants, as they wandered about Germanic countries doing their recruiting.

The vast majority of these poor, go-now-pay-later travelers were not redeemed by family members, in America, and so the term is misleading in that most of them paid for their emigration with their own toil, tears, and sometimes their life, as a redemptioner. In America, their labour was considered a good to be lawfully bought and sold until their indentures matured. The main differences between redemptioners and African slaves, were that redemptioners came of their own accord (even if misinformed) and that they had some legal rights and an “out-of-indenture” date to look forward to. An example of how the indentured servant was viewed is the 1662 Virginia law that forced both slave and indentured servant females, who bore children by their masters, to serve even more time, after their indentures had ended, for an additional two years, for the local churchwardens. No penalty was specified for their masters for what they had done to them. On the other hand, a Virginia law of the same year stipulated that "any servant giving notice to their masters (having just cause of complaint against them) for harsh and bad usage, or else for want of diet or convenient necessaries... [shall] have remedy for his grievances."

Abuse of redemptioners on board the ships is well documented. If a person died, after half-way across the Atlantic, the surviving family members had to pay for the deceased's fare. The redemptioner's baggage was often pilfered by the crew as well. Furthermore, many travelers started their journey with sufficient funds to pay their way, but were overcharged, so that they arrived with a debt to settle, and therefore, they had to be redeemed. If the ship needed to sail back to Europe, before all of the passengers’ indentures had been sold, an agent in the American port kept them confined, until a buyer presented himself.

The redemptioners who became indentured servants ended up working as farm laborers, household help, in workshops, and even as store clerks. They were typically prevented from marrying until after their term of service ended. Often, the terms of separation stipulated that the servant receive a suit of clothing and sometimes, a shovel or an axe. Also, some contracts required the master to teach the servant to read and write from the Bible. Conditions were sometimes harsh, as evidenced by the lists and paid announcements for the return of escaped servants in the newspapers.

The Rotterdam ships always stopped first in the U.K. (often at Cowes) to clear British customs, before proceeding to the Colonies. A list of indenture registrations in Philadelphia from 1772 to 1773 survives, and it reveals that most redemptioners worked for five to seven years, to pay their masters off. (The Bible allowed no more than seven years term of any contract, and this influenced both the law and public opinion.)

== Accounts ==
The only two surviving first-person accounts by redemptioners were published in September 2006 in the book Souls for Sale: Two German Redemptioners Come to Revolutionary America. By coincidence, they both arrived in Philadelphia on the ship Sally, in the fall of 1772. John Frederick Whitehead and Johann Carl Buettner were recruited in Baltic cities, and shipped as virtual prisoners to Rotterdam, originally to be delivered to ships of the Dutch East India Company that were departing for Indonesia. Their handlers missed that opportunity, so they settled for handing them over to a ship bound for Pennsylvania.

Over time, Germans, who had finished their indentures, formed German-American societies, and one important activity for them was to lobby for humane regulations and policing of the shipping companies.

The German immigrant to Missouri, Gottfried Duden, whose published letters (1829) did much to encourage German-speaking emigration to the U.S. in the 1800s, wrote about the redemptioners. “The poor Europeans who think they have purchased the land of their desires by the hardships endured during the journey across the sea are enslaved for five, seven, or more years for a sum that any vigorous day laborer earns within six months. The wife is separated from the husband, the children from their parents, perhaps never to see each other again.” But by the time that Duden published his letters, the redemptioner system was all but dead.

== See also ==
- Slavery in the colonial United States
- Indentured servitude in the Americas
  - Indentured servitude in Pennsylvania
  - Indentured servitude in Virginia
- Indian slave trade in the American Southeast
- Gottlieb Mittelberger
- Plantation Act 1740
- Nationality law in the American Colonies
