= Gottlieb Mittelberger =

German writer, educator and clergyman

- Born: 1714: Enzweihingen, Vaihingen; Duchy of Württemberg; Holy Roman Empire
- Died: 1758 (aged 43–44); Holy Roman Empire
- Occupations: Author; Schoolmaster; Organist; Lutheran Pastor
- Writing career
- Notable work: Journey to Pennsylvania

Gottlieb Mittelberger (1714 – 1758) was a German author, schoolmaster, organist, and Lutheran pastor. He was best known for his work Journey to Pennsylvania (1756). Mittelberger's travelogue provides a firsthand historic account of the misery and exploitation of German immigrants during the US colonial period. In his work, he tries to convince his fellow Germans not to immigrate to the American colonies, as the forfeiture of freedom, cost of money, lack of health, and loss of life are too exorbitant to risk and sacrifice. Although never an indentured servant, Mittelberger's written testament is one of several surviving historic works describing the hardships of the redemption system.

His meticulous account of his sea voyage to the British Atlantic colonies and subsequent experiences in Pennsylvania has become academically notable, due to the scarcity in primary source material concerning several of the issues he details. Such topics include religious practices in colonial Pennsylvania, European passenger fares for children and adults, as well as the nature and consequences of epidemics on colonial era ships. The work is also noted for its lengthy discussion of sexuality and social mores, including an account of a bigamous threesome and the status of illegitimate children, as evidencing the religious and sexual tolerance of colonial America.

== Life ==
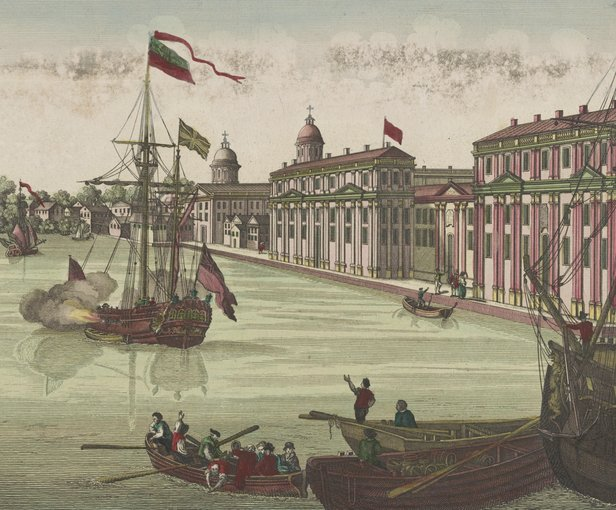
Print by Balthasar Leizelt (1770s) depicting Philadelphia, as a European port city, a generation after Mittelberger came to America.

In 1714, Mittelberger was born in Enzweihingen, Vaihingen County in the Duchy of Württemberg of the Holy Roman Empire. He became a schoolmaster in his native Enzweihingen but lost his job around 1750. In the spring of 1750, Mittelberger was offered a position as organist and schoolmaster in New Providence, Pennsylvania.

In May 1750, he left for the town of Heilbronn, where he met up with the river boat to take him and an organ up the Neckar and Rhine into the Netherlands. From Rotterdam, he boarded the British ship Osgood for England and the British Atlantic colony of Pennsylvania. Upon arriving, Mittelberger worked for the German Saint Augustine's Church in New Providence, Pennsylvania. He also became a private instructor of music and tutor of the German language. Among Mittelberger's employers was Captain John Diemer, who led a British colonial expedition into Quebec against New France in 1746 to 1747.

Becoming disenfranchised with the Province of Pennsylvania, he returned to his native Duchy in 1754. Over the next two years, Mittelberger finished writing Journey to Pennsylvania, which was subsequently published in Stuttgart, with the permission of Duke Charles Eugene of Württemberg. He died in the Duchy of Württemberg in 1758.

== Journey to Pennsylvania ==
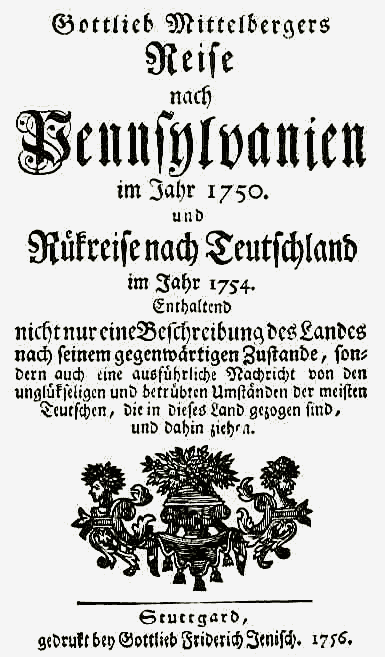
Gottlieb Mittelberger's (1756) Journey to Pennsylvania

In Journey to Pennsylvania, published in 1756, Mittelberger wrote a two-part travelogue about his voyage and experiences in colonial America. The first part is entitled "In America" and focuses on the suffering of the underprivileged. The second part is entitled "Description of the Land Pennsylvania" and is more analytical, as Mittelberger discusses sociological and religious topics.

Observing from the perspective of a ship passenger aboard the Dutch vessel Osgood, Mittelberger documented the harrowing experiences of the 400 impoverished European immigrants making the transatlantic voyage from Rotterdam to Philadelphia. The majority of the passengers were representative of the influx of Germans to America from Baden, Württemberg, and the Palatinate. Mittelberger details the exploitation of these poor immigrants by the Newlanders, ship crew and captains, as well as American colonists.

=== On religion and tolerance ===
Mittelberger expounds upon the lack of religious belief and practice in mid-18th century Philadelphia. He was astonished by the general absence of belief in God and a lack of knowledge of the Bible. Contrarily, he is confronted by a city dominated by free thinkers and infidels. The cultural influence of the Enlightenment is thus attested by Mittelberger's firsthand experience of religious skepticism, naturalism, and the popularity of Deism. By 1750, the decline in Christianity is indicated by the existence of only eighteen churches in Philadelphia, serving a city of over 30,000 inhabitants. As Mittelberger notes:

Besides, there are many hundreds of adult persons who have not been and do not even wish to be baptized. There are many who think nothing of the sacraments and the Holy Bible, nor even of God and His word. Many do not even believe that there is a true God and a devil, a heaven and a hell, salvation and damnation, resurrection of the dead, a judgment and eternal life; they believe that all one can see is natural. For in Pennsylvania every one may not only believe what he will, but he may even say it freely and openly.

According to historian Russell Weigley, Mittelberger was surprised by the relative lack of religious bigotry in colonial America, namely in contrast to the religious fervor and intolerance of the Old World. As Mittelberger wrote of the American colonists: "To speak the truth, one seldom hears or sees a quarrel among them [which is] the result of the liberty which they enjoy and which makes them all equal."

=== On the misfortune of indentured servants ===
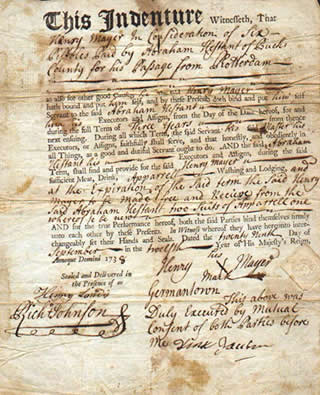
An indentured servant's contract (1738) from Bucks County, Pennsylvania.

Mittelberger's primary focus concerns the tribulations of the European immigrants to the British Atlantic colonies. In particular, he wrote of the precarious transatlantic voyage, as well as the sale and exploitation of immigrants into indentured servitude. Mittelberger describes the health conditions at sea as harrowing:

But during the voyage there is on board these ships terrible misery, stench, fumes, horror, vomiting, many kinds of sea-sickness, fever, dysentery, headache, heat, constipation, boils, scurvy, cancer, mouth-rot, and the like, all of which come from old and sharply salted food and meat, also from very bad and foul water, so that many die miserably.

Mittelberger continues:

That most of the people get sick is not surprising, because, in addition to all other trials and hardships, warm food is served only three times a week, the rations being very poor and very little. Such meals can hardly be eaten, on account of being so unclean. The water which is served out on the ships is often very black, thick and full of worms, so that one cannot drink it without loathing, even with the greatest thirst. Toward the end we were compelled to eat the ship's biscuit which had been spoiled long ago; though in a whole biscuit there was scarcely a, piece the size of a dollar that had not been full of red worms and spiders nests.

=== On the structure of passenger fare ===
As economic historian Farley Grubb states, there are scarce remaining sources in the world documenting 18th century transatlantic passenger fare. Consequently, there is historic significance in Mittelberger documenting the uniform pay for passage to America as being structured by the age of the immigrant. Children under five years of age are free. However, the fee from Rotterdam for any person ten years of age or higher was ten British pounds or 60 Dutch florins (guilders). Children between five and ten years were half priced at 30 florins or five pounds.

=== On sexual and familial practices ===
As cultural historian Clare Lyons observes, there are three lengthy sexual stories documented by Mittelberger in his travelogue. Similar to the religious tolerance of the era, colonial Philadelphia in the 1750s was relatively hospitable to various forms of sexual behavior and familial structure. As Lyons summarizes:

According to Gottlieb Mittelberger...the town was a place of lax moral discipline, courtship went unregulated, women exercised too much power within marriage, and nonmarital sexuality rampant.

Mittelberger gives as an example the case of an old couple living close to the Blue Mountains in rural Pennsylvania. The old woman, ill and weak, requests of her husband to marry their young servant maid Rosina. The husband and Rosina both consent to the request and marry, whereby Rosina becomes pregnant shortly thereafter. Meanwhile, the first wife's health continues to improve over time. When the colonial authorities learn of the bigamous relationship, they choose not to interfere. Whereas English law punishes bigamy by execution, the authorities do not in this case act, insofar as neither of the wives felt dissatisfied or injured by the bigamy.

== See also ==
- Colonial history of the United States
- James Hamilton (Pennsylvania)
- Indentured servitude in Pennsylvania
- Province of Pennsylvania
- Redemptioner

== Bibliography and further reading ==
- Grubb, Farley (1985). "The Market for Indentured Immigrants: Evidence on the Efficiency of Forward-Labor Contracting in Philadelphia, 1745-1773" (PDF). The Journal of Economic History. 45 (4). Cambridge University Press: 855–868. doi:10.1017/s0022050700035130. S2CID 36848963.
- Henneton, Lauric; Roper, Louis, eds. (2016). Fear and the Shaping of Early American Societies. Leiden: BRILL. ISBN 978-9004314740.
- Lyons, Clare (2012). Sex Among the Rabble: An Intimate History of Gender and Power in the Age of Revolution, Philadelphia, 1730-1830. Chapel Hill, NC: UNC Press Books. ISBN 9780807838969.
- Mittelberger, Gottlieb (1898). Journey to Pennsylvania in the Year 1750 and Return to Germany in the Year 1754. Philadelphia: John Joseph McCevy.
- Weigley, Russell (1982). Philadelphia: A 300 Year History. New York: W. W. Norton & Company. p. 101. ISBN 9780393016109. "gottlieb mittelberger Russell Weigley."
