= Indentured servitude in British America =

17th–19th century labor system in the British American colonies

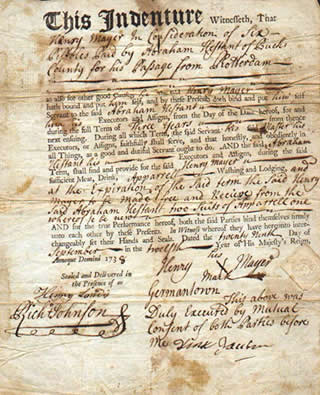
An 18th-century indentured servitude contract

Indentured servitude in British America was the prominent system of labor in the British American colonies until it was eventually supplanted by slavery. During its time, the system was so prominent that more than half of all immigrants to British colonies south of New England were white servants, and that nearly half of total white immigration to the Thirteen Colonies came under indenture. By the beginning of the American Revolutionary War in 1775, only 2 to 3 percent of the colonial labor force was composed of indentured servants.

The consensus view among economic historians and economists is that indentured servitude became popular in the Thirteen Colonies in the seventeenth century because of a large demand for labor there, coupled with labor surpluses in Europe and high costs of transatlantic transportation beyond the means of European workers. Between the 1630s and the American Revolution, one-half to two-thirds of white immigrants to the Thirteen Colonies arrived under indentures. Half a million Europeans, mostly young men, also went to the Caribbean under indenture to work on plantations. Fraud and sometimes even force were widely used as methods of recruitment. A debt peonage system similar to indenture was also used in southern New England and Long Island to control and assimilate Native Americans from the 1600s through the American Revolution.

Indentured servitude continued in North America into the early 20th century, but the number of indentured servants declined over time. Although experts do not agree on the causes of the decline, possible factors for the American colonies include changes in the labor market and the legal system that made it cheaper and less risky for an employer to hire African slave labor or paid employees, or made indentures unlawful; increased affordability of travel to North America that made immigrants less likely to rely on indentures to pay travel costs; and effects of the American Revolution, particularly on immigration from Britain. In the Caribbean, the number of indentured servants from Europe began to decline in the 17th century as Europeans became aware of the cruelty of plantation masters and the high death rate of servants, largely due to tropical disease. After the British Empire ended slavery in 1833, plantation owners returned to indentured servitude for labor, with most servants coming from India, until the British government prohibited the practice in 1917.

== North America ==
Between one-half and two-thirds of European immigrants to the Thirteen Colonies between the 1630s and the American Revolution came under indentures. The practice was sufficiently common that the Habeas Corpus Act 1667, in part, prevented imprisonments overseas; it also made provisions for those with existing transportation contracts and those "praying to be transported" in lieu of remaining in prison upon conviction. In any case, while half the European immigrants to the Thirteen Colonies had been indentured servants at some time, actively indentured servants were outnumbered by non-indentured workers, or by those whose indenture had expired. Thus free wage labor was more common for Europeans in the colonies. Indentured persons were numerically important mostly in the region from Virginia north to New Jersey. Other colonies saw far fewer of them. The total number of European immigrants to all 13 colonies before 1775 was 500,000–550,000; of these, 55,000 were involuntary prisoners. Of the 450,000 or so European arrivals who came voluntarily, Tomlins estimates that 48% were indentured. About 75% were under the age of 25. The age of legal adulthood for men was 24 years; those over 24 generally came on contracts lasting about 3 years. Regarding the children who came, Gary Nash reports that, "many of the servants were actually nephews, nieces, cousins and children of friends of emigrating Englishmen, who paid their passage in return for their labor once in America."

Farmers, merchants, and shopkeepers in the British colonies found it very difficult to hire free workers, primarily because it was easy for potential workers to set up their own farms. Consequently, a common solution was to transport a young worker from Britain or a German state, who would work for several years to pay off the debt of their travel costs. During the indenture period the servants were not paid cash wages, but were provided with food, accommodation, clothing and training. The indenture document specified how many years the servant would be required to work, after which they would be free. Terms of indenture ranged from one to seven years with typical terms of four or five years. In southern New England, a variant form of indentured servitude, which controlled the labor of Native Americans through an exploitative debt-peonage system, developed in the late 17th century and continued through to the period of the American Revolution.

Not all European servants came willingly. Several instances of kidnapping for transportation to the Americas are recorded, though these were often indentured in the same way as their willing counterparts. An illustrative example is that of Peter Williamson (1730–1799). As historian Richard Hofstadter pointed out, "Although efforts were made to regulate or check their activities, and they diminished in importance in the eighteenth century, it remains true that a certain small part of the white colonial population of America was brought by force, and a much larger portion came in response to deceit and misrepresentation on the part of the spirits [recruiting agents]."

Many white immigrants arrived in colonial America as indentured servants, usually as young men and women from Britain or Germany, under the age of 21. Typically, the father of a teenager would sign the legal papers, and work out an arrangement with a ship captain, who would not charge the father any money. The captain would transport the indentured servants to the American colonies, and sell their legal papers to someone who needed workers. At the end of the indenture, the young person was given a new suit of clothes and was free to leave. Many immediately set out to begin their own farms, while others used their newly acquired skills to pursue a trade. A few became sufficiently prosperous that they were eventually able to acquire indentured servants of their own.

Given the high death rate, many servants did not live to the end of their terms. In the 18th and early 19th century, numerous Europeans, mostly from outside the British Isles, traveled to the colonies as redemptioners, a particularly harsh form of indenture.

Indentured servants were a separate category from bound apprentices. The latter were American-born children, usually orphans or from an impoverished family who could not care for them. They were under the control of courts and were bound out to work as an apprentice until a certain age. Two famous bound apprentices were Benjamin Franklin who illegally fled his apprenticeship to his brother, and Andrew Johnson, who later became President of the United States.

George Washington used indentured servants; in April 1775, he offered a reward for the return of two runaway white servants.

=== Development ===
Indentured servitude in the Americas was first used by the Virginia Company in the early seventeenth century as a method for collateralizing the debt finance for transporting people to its newfound British colonies.

Before the rise of indentured servitude, a large demand for labor existed in the colonies to help build settlements, farm crops and serve as tradesmen, but many laborers in Europe could not afford the transatlantic crossing, which could cost roughly half a worker's annual wage.

European financial institutions could not easily lend to the workers since there was no effective way to enforce a loan from across the Atlantic, rendering labor immobile via the Atlantic because of capital market imperfections.

To address this imperfection, the Virginia Company would allow laborers to borrow against their future earnings at the Virginia Company for a fixed number of years in order to raise sufficient capital to pay for their voyage. Evidence shows this practice was in use by 1609, only two years after the founding of the Virginia Company's original Jamestown settlement. However, this practice created a financial risk for the Virginia Company. If workers died or refused to work, the investment would be lost.

By 1620, the Virginia Company switched to selling contracts of "one hundred servants to be disposed among the old Planters" as soon as the servants reached the colonies. This minimized risk on its investment to the two–three months of transatlantic voyage. As the system gained in popularity, individual farmers and tradesmen would eventually begin investing in indentured servants as well.

The archaeological excavation of a 17th-century Maryland residence in Anne Arundel County discovered what was most likely an indentured servant who was murdered, buried and hidden beneath the floor alongside a garbage pit. In 1661 Virginia law prohibited the inappropriate burial of indentured servants. The Transportation Act 1717 established a regulated system for indentured criminal laborers.

In the 18th century, wages in Great Britain were low because of a surplus of labor. The average monetary wage was about 50 shillings (£2.50, equivalent to £444 in 2025) a year for a plowman, and 40 shillings (£2) a year for an ordinary unskilled worker. Ships' captains negotiated prices for transporting and feeding a passenger on the seven- or eight-week journey across the ocean, averaging about £5 to £7, equivalent to years of work back in England.

Still, demand for indentured labor remained relatively low until the adoption of staple crops, such as sugarcane in the West Indies or tobacco in the American South. With economies largely based on these crops, the West Indies and American South would see the vast majority of indentured labour.

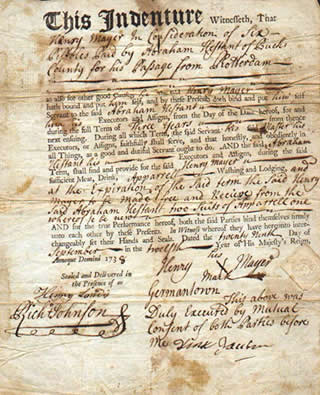
An indenture signed by Henry Mayer, with an "X", in 1738. This contract bound Mayer to Abraham Hestant of Bucks County, Pennsylvania, who had paid for Mayer to travel from Europe.

Author and historian Richard Hofstadter has written:

The most unenviable situation was that of servants on Southern plantations, living alongside but never with Negro slaves, both groups doing much the same work, often under the supervision of a relentless overseer… Even as late as 1770, William Eddis, the English surveyor of customs at Annapolis, thought that the Maryland Negroes were better off than "the Europeans, over whom the rigid planter exercises an inflexible severity." The Negroes, Eddis thought, were a lifelong property so were treated with a certain care, but the whites were "strained to the utmost to perform their allotted labour."

Over time the market for indentured servitude developed, with length of contracts showing close correlations to indicators of health and productivity. Tall, strong, healthy, literate or skilled servants would often serve shorter terms than less productive or more sickly servants. Similarly, destinations with harsh working climates such as the West Indies would come to offer shorter contracts compared to the more hospitable colonies.

The majority of indentured servants ended up in the American South, where cash crops necessitated labor-intensive farming. As the Northern colonies moved toward industrialization, they received far less indentured immigration. For example, 96% of English emigrants to Virginia and Maryland from 1773 to 1776 were indentured servants. During the same time period, 2% of English emigrants to New England were indentured.

=== Legal documents ===
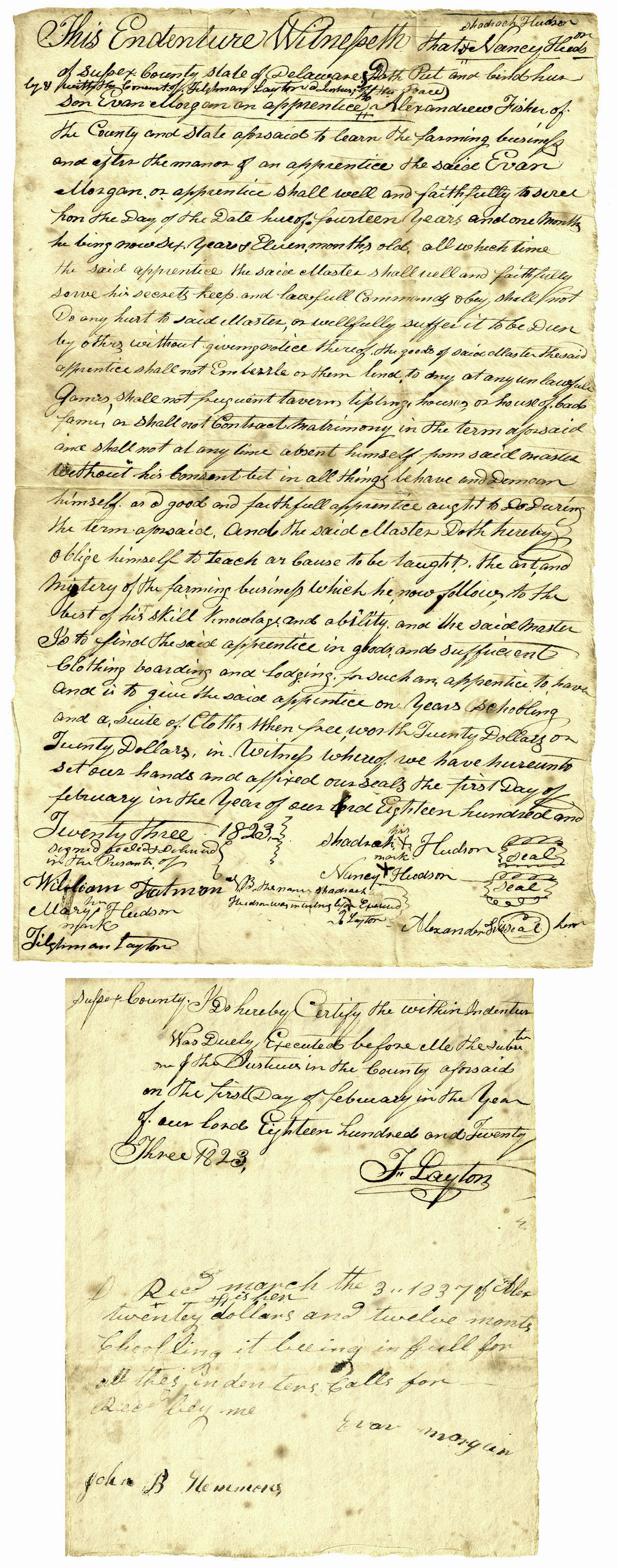
Indenture of apprenticeship binding Evan Morgan, a child aged 6 years and 11 months, for a period of 14 years, 1 month. Dated Feb. 1, 1823, Sussex Co., Delaware.

An indenture was a legal contract enforced by the courts. One indenture reads as follows:

This INDENTURE Witnesseth that James Best a Labourer doth Voluntarily put himself Servant to Captain Stephen Jones Master of the Snow Sally to serve the said Stephen Jones and his Assigns, for and during the full Space, Time and Term of three Years from the first Day of the said James’ arrival in Philadelphia in AMERICA, during which Time or Term the said Master or his Assigns shall and will find and supply the said James with sufficient Meat, Drink, Apparel, Lodging and all other necessaries befitting such a Servant, and at the end and expiration of said Term, the said James to be made Free, and receive according to the Custom of the Country. Provided nevertheless, and these Presents are on this Condition, that if the said James shall pay the said Stephen Jones or his Assigns 15 Pounds British in twenty one Days after his arrival he shall be Free, and the above Indenture and every Clause therein, absolutely Void and of no Effect. In Witness whereof the said Parties have hereunto interchangeably put their Hands and Seals the 6th Day of July in the Year of our Lord, One Thousand Seven Hundred and Seventy Three in the Presence of the Right Worshipful Mayor of the City of London. (signatures)

When the ship arrived, the captain would often advertise in a newspaper that indentured servants were for sale:

Just imported, on board the Snow Sally, Captain Stephen Jones, Master, from England, A number of healthy, stout English and Welsh Servants and Redemptioners, and a few Palatines [Germans], amongst whom are the following tradesmen, viz. Blacksmiths, watch-makers, coppersmiths, taylors, shoemakers, ship-carpenters and caulkers, weavers, cabinet-makers, ship-joiners, nailers, engravers, copperplate printers, plasterers, bricklayers, sawyers and painters. Also schoolmasters, clerks and book-keepers, farmers and labourers, and some lively smart boys, fit for various other employments, whose times are to be disposed of. Enquire of the Captain on board the vessel, off Walnut-street wharff, or of MEASE and CALDWELL.

When a buyer was found, the sale would be recorded at the city court. The Philadelphia Mayor’s Court Indenture Book, page 742, for September 18, 1773 has the following entry:

James Best, who was under Indenture of Redemption to Captain Stephen Jones now cancelled in consideration of £ 15, paid for his Passage from London bound a servant to David Rittenhouse of the City of Philadelphia & assigns three years to be found all necessaries.

=== Restrictions ===
Indentures could not marry without the permission of their owner, were subject to physical punishment (like many young ordinary servants), and saw their obligation to labor enforced by the courts. To ensure uninterrupted work by the female servants, the law lengthened the term of their indenture if they became pregnant. But unlike slaves, servants were guaranteed to be eventually released from bondage. At the end of their term they received a payment known as "freedom dues" and became free members of society. One could buy and sell indentured servants' contracts, and the right to their labor would change hands, but not the person as a piece of property.

Both male and female laborers could be subject to violence, occasionally even resulting in death. Richard Hofstadter notes that, as slaves arrived in greater numbers after 1700, white laborers in Virginia became a "privileged stratum, assigned to lighter work and more skilled tasks". He also notes that "Runaways were regularly advertised in the newspapers, rewards were offered, and both sheriffs and the general public were enlisted to secure their return. ... The standard penalty in the North, not always rigorously enforced, was extra service of twice the time the master had lost, though whipping was also common."

=== Redemptioner profile ===
Indentured servitude was a method of increasing the number of colonists, especially in the English and later British colonies. Voluntary migration and convict labor only provided so many people, and since the journey across the Atlantic was dangerous, other means of encouraging settlement were necessary. Contract-laborers became an important group of people and so numerous that the United States Constitution counted them specifically in appointing representatives:

Representatives and direct Taxes shall be apportioned among the several States which may be included within this Union, according to their respective Numbers, which shall be determined by adding to the whole Number of free Persons, including those bound to Service for a Term of Years....

Displaced from their land and unable to find work in the cities, many of these people signed contracts of indenture and took passage to the Americas. In Massachusetts, religious instruction in the Puritan way of life was often part of the condition of indenture, and people tended to live in towns.

The labor-intensive cash crop of tobacco was farmed in the American South by indentured laborers in the 17th and 18th centuries. Indentured servitude was not the same as the apprenticeship system by which skilled trades were taught, but similarities do exist between the two, since both require a set period of work. The majority of Virginians were Anglican, not Puritan, and while religion did play a large role in everyday lives, the culture was more commercially based. In the Chesapeake and North Carolina, tobacco constituted a major percentage of the total agricultural output. In the Deep South (mainly Georgia and South Carolina), cotton and rice plantations dominated. In the lower Atlantic colonies where tobacco was the main cash crop, the majority of labor that indentured servants performed was related to field work. In this situation, social isolation could increase the possibilities for both direct and indirect abuse, as could lengthy, demanding labor in the tobacco fields.

The system was still widely practiced in the 1780s, picking up immediately after a hiatus during the American Revolution. Fernand Braudel (The Perspective of the World 1984, pp. 405ff) instances a 1783 report on "the import trade from Ireland" and its large profits to a ship owner or a captain, who:

...puts his conditions to the emigrants in Dublin or some other Irish port. Those who can pay for their passage—usually about 100 or 80 [livres tournois]—arrive in America free to take any engagement that suits them. Those who cannot pay are carried at the expense of the shipowner, who in order to recoup his money, advertises on arrival that he has imported artisans, laborers and domestic servants and that he has agreed with them on his own account to hire their services for a period normally of three, four, or five years for men and women and 6 or 7 years for children.

In modern terms, the shipowner was acting as a contractor, hiring out his laborers. Such circumstances affected the treatment a captain gave his valuable human cargo. After indentures were forbidden, the passage had to be prepaid, giving rise to the inhumane conditions of Irish 'coffin ships' in the second half of the 19th century.

=== Southern New England Native Americans and indenture ===
Starting in the late 17th century, in southern New England and parts of Long Island, Native Americans were increasingly pulled into an exploitative debt-peonage system designed to control and assimilate Native American people into the dominant culture as well as channel their labor into the market-based Atlantic economy. Following King Philip's War (1675–1676) most Native Americans in the region were resigned to reservations or lived in increasingly marginal enclaves on the edges of colonial towns. Due to restricted access to resources, land loss, and changes to the environment caused by European settlement, many Native Americans, especially coastal groups, could no longer practice traditional subsistence activities and therefore became increasingly dependent on European trade goods—cloth, tools, guns, alcohol, and increasingly, food. Merchants trading these items to Native Americans often inflated the cost and, based on a predatory lending scheme, advanced them credit for these purchases, knowing full well most Native Americans would not be able to repay the debts. Eventually when debts mounted, Native Americans were hauled into court by their creditors. When they could not pay either their lands, or more commonly their labor, was seized to settle the debt. Native American debtors were then indentured to their creditors for terms ranging from a few months to sometimes years. Rare cases exist when Native Americans were indentured for a decade or more and a few were enslaved for life (this was quite rare however). Many Native Americans experienced repeated indentures over the course of their lifetimes, amounting to a phenomenon of 'serial indenture' or debt peonage—multiple short indentures alternating with brief periods of 'freedom.' The 'time' Native American servants owed could be sold or willed to heirs if a creditor died.

Assessing how many Native Americans experienced indenture is difficult as exact Native American populations during the colonial period are unknown. However, Historian John Sainsbury was able to document that by the mid-18th century about a third of all Native Americans in Rhode Island were indentured servants living and working in white households. Also, the Massachusetts state archives contains numerous petitions, written from the 1730s to 1760s from Native American tribes in their jurisdiction complaining about abuses in the indenture system and predatory lending by whites. Statutes were eventually passed attempting to regulate practices. Colonial military records do provide some data on Native American indenture as well. Enlistment records from 1704 to 1726 show that almost two-thirds of Native Americans who joined the army were indentured at the time of their enlistment. Records from 1748 to 1760 show a decline in this rate, but still show almost a third of Native American recruits being bound to white masters at the time of their enlistment. One Connecticut regiment raised in 1746 during King George's War (containing 980 men total) contained 139 Native American men. Almost half of them had signed their wages over to white creditors before being deployed.

While many Native American men, women and children became servants in New England households, the labor of many adult men was funneled into the whaling industry on Long Island, Rhode Island, Cape Cod and the islands of Martha's Vineyard and Nantucket, as well as the coast of eastern Connecticut. These whaling indentures were somewhat distinct from normal indenture contracts, and stipulated that Native Americans serve not as servants in white households but instead as crew members on a certain number of whaling voyages or 'seasons' of whaling (typically November through April). Throughout most of the colonial period indentured or heavily indebted Native American whalers were the primary labor force in the early whaling industry. They remained an important source of labor into the Revolutionary and early national era, but as their numbers dwindled and the industry expanded exponentially, they made up a decreasingly small proportion of the labor force.

Text of Whaling Indenture Contract of Isaac Pepenie (Wampanoag Indian) to James Lovell Jr. 1729.:

Witnesseth that Isaac Pepenie Indian of Falmouth, Barnstable labourer, hath ... of his own free will ... Bound and obliged himself to Serve James Lovell Junr ... a Sea faring man, on Diverse Whale Voiages in the several seasons ... the date of these presents: viz. this winter season in ... Barnstable, and the next Spring at Nantucket, and former season following in the sloops or vessels that ... [Lovell] desire[s], all which respective voyages ... and any and all materials for the performing of sd. Voyages ... he the said Isaac Pepenie to have one eighth and diet according to costom ... as shall be needful with his master for the sum of fifteen pounds which he the said James Lovell doth hereby agree to pay for him, ... then the sd. Pepenie doth by these [agreements] oblige himself to attend [the] Whale Voiages at the order and direction of said James Lovell, his administrators or assigns in manner aforesaid ... this first day of October in the Eleventh year of His Majesty's Reign ano dom 1729.

Isaac Papenie
Barnstable.

We the subscribers two of his Majestys Justices of the Peace for said County being present at the execution of the premises do allow and approbate the same as just and reasonable.

Danl. Parker, Joseph Lothrop

=== Decline ===
Indentured servitude appeared in the Americas in the 1620s and remained in use as late as 1917. The causes behind its decline are a contentious domain in economic history.

The end of debtors' prisons may have created a limited commitment pitfall in which indentured servants could agree to contracts with ship captains and then refuse to sell themselves once they arrived in the colonies. Increased lobbying from immigrant aid societies led to increased regulation of the indentured labor market, further increasing the difficulty of enforcing contracts. With less ability to enforce the contracts, demand for indentured servants may have fallen. However, most debtor prisons were still in service when indentured servitude disappeared and many regulations on indentured servitude were put in place well before the practice's disappearance.

A rise in European per-capita income compared to passage fare during the nineteenth century may also explain the disappearance of indentured servitude. While passage from England to the colonies in 1668 would cost roughly 51 percent of English per-capita income, that ratio would decrease to between 20 and 30 percent by 1841. This increase in relative income may have been further supplemented by a demonstrated increase in savings among European laborers, meaning European emigrants would have the capital on hand to pay for their own passage. With no need for transit capital, fewer laborers would have become indentured, and the supply of indentured servants would have decreased.

Labor substitutions may have led employers away from indentured servants and towards slaves or paid employees. In many places, African slaves became cheaper for unskilled and then eventually skilled labor, and most farmhand positions previously filled by indentured servants were ultimately filled by slaves. Wage laborers may have been more productive, since employers were more willing to terminate waged employment. In comparison, firing an indentured servant would mean a loss on the original capital investment spent purchasing the servant's contract. Either substitution would lead to a decrease in demand for indentured servitude. An additional problem for employers was that, compared to African slaves, European indentured servants who ran away could not always be easily distinguished from the general white population, so they were more difficult to re-capture.

Indentured servitude's decline for white servants was also largely a result of changing attitudes that accrued over the 18th century and culminated in the early 19th century. Over the 18th century, the penal sanctions that were used against all workers were slowly going away from colonial codes, leaving indentured servants the only adult white labor subject to penal sanctions (with the notable exception of seaman, whose contracts could be criminally enforced up to the 20th century). These penal sanctions for indentured laborers continued in the United States until the 1830s, and by this point treatment of European laborers under contract became the same as the treatment of wage laborers (however, this change in treatment didn't apply to workers of color). This change in treatment can be attributed to a number of factors, such as the growing identification of white indented labor with slavery at a time when slavery was coming under attack in the Northern states, the growing radicalism of workers influenced with the rhetoric of the American Revolution, and the expansion of suffrage in many states which empowered workers politically. Penal sanctions, previously considered perfectly in line with free labor, became in the 19th century a way to transform ordinary labor into "contracts of slavery."

==== Labor market dynamics ====
Given the rapid expansion of colonial export industries in the 17th and 18th century, natural population growth and immigration were unable to meet the increasing demand for workers. As a result, the cost of indentured servants rose substantially. In the Chesapeake Bay, for example, the cost of indentures rose as much as 60% in the 1680s. The increase in the price of indentures did not motivate European workers to emigrate, for they did not benefit from the higher prices. As a result, the companies that generated indentures disrupted the price signaling effect, and thus the supply of immigrants did not expand sufficiently to meet demand. Some actors in the market attempted to generate incentives for workers by shortening the length of indenture contracts, based on the productivity of the prospective emigrant. Some American firms also opted to incentivize workers by paying small wages or by negotiating early expiration of indentures. These measures increased the cost of an indenture, while early termination made it less valuable.

The rising cost of indentured labor and its inelastic supply pushed American producers towards a cheaper alternative: enslaved workers. Not only were they substantially cheaper, the supply was more abundant; in contrast with indentured workers, they had to emigrate whether they wanted to or not. No incentives were necessary, although higher prices motivated slave traders to expand "production" (in the form of raiding expeditions). Supply was relatively elastic. Slavery thus was better able to satisfy labor demands in colonies requiring large quantities of unskilled agricultural workers (for example, plantation colonies in the Caribbean). Indentures, however, prevailed in colonies that required skilled workers, since the cost of an indenture was less than the cost of training an enslaved worker. Alison Smith and Abbott E. Smith's analysis of London port records shows how the destinations of indentured emigrants shifted from the West Indies towards New England as early as the 1660s, supporting the theory that indentured servitude might have declined in some regions because of labor market dynamics.

==== Affordability of immigration ====
The rise in the affordability of immigration reduced emigrants’ need for external financing in the form of indentures. David Galenson's analysis on affordability shows that the cost of immigration from Britain to the United States over the course of the 18th century dropped from 50% of per capita income to less than 10%. This is attributable to higher levels of real income in Europe (a result of economic growth in the 18th century) and to a sharp decline in transportation costs. Innovation had a strong impact on the ease and cost of passenger transportation, reducing the need of indentures. The railroad made non-port cities a much cheaper destination for immigrants. The steamboat was not necessarily cheaper than older sailing technologies, but it made transatlantic travel much easier and comfortable, an attractive factor for high-income classes (that could easily afford immigration without indentures).

The British Navy's efforts against piracy also reduced transportation costs. Safer seas implied smaller crews (for there was no need to man weapons on board) and also reduced insurance costs (ships were at lower risk of being captured).

The composition of immigrants also shifted from single males towards entire families. Single males usually left their homes with little if any savings. Instead, families generally liquidated assets in Europe to finance their venture.

==== Impact of American Revolution ====
The American Revolution severely limited immigration to the United States. Economic historians differ however on the long-term impact of the Revolution. Sharon Salinger argues that the economic crisis that followed the war made long-term labor contracts unattractive. Her analysis of Philadelphia's population shows how the percentage of bound citizens fell from 17% to 6% over the course of the war. William Miller posits a more moderate theory, stating "the Revolution (…) wrought disturbances upon white servitude. But these were temporary rather than lasting". David Galenson supports this theory by proposing that British indentures never recovered, but Europeans from other nationalities replaced them.

==== Legal deterrence ====
In 1799 New York State passed the Act for the Gradual Abolition of Slavery. Existing slaves became indentured servants. That status was finally ended in 1827 and all the indentured obtained full freedom.

A number of acts passed by both the American and the British governments fostered the decline of indentures. The British Passenger Vessels Act 1803, which regulated travel conditions aboard ships, attempted to make transportation more expensive in order to stop emigration. The American abolition of imprisonment of debtors by federal law (passed in 1833) made prosecution of runaway servants more difficult, increasing the risk of indenture contract purchases.

In the 19th century, most indentures of this nature occurred in the old Northwest Territory. The permissibility of such indentures centered on the interpretation of "involuntary servitude" per the 1787 Northwest Ordinance, which declared:

There shall be neither slavery nor involuntary servitude in the territory otherwise than in the punishment of crimes, whereof the Party shall have been duly convicted.

The permissibility (or not) of penal sanctions in labor became an issue of "fundamental law", in which it was questioned whether those sanctions or specific performance enforcements turned indentured servitude into "involuntary servitude". At the time when the Northwest Ordinance was constructed, white adult servants were still being imported into the United States, and thus, historically, it seems likely that the Ordinance's framers considered indenture to be a form of "voluntary" servitude. In essence, this means the indentured servant chose to work for someone who bought them something.

The Territory of Hawaii was the last place in the United States to widely use indentures, as by 1900 the practice had been abolished in the rest of the country and replaced by alternatives such as the credit-ticket system used to transport Chinese laborers. Prior to U.S. annexation, indentures were widely used to transport Japanese contract workers to Hawaii for plantation work. In the Hawaiian Organic Act of 1900 the U.S. prohibited further use of indentures in the territory and voided all such existing contracts, thus ending the practice.

== Caribbean ==
=== European servants in colonies ===
A half million Europeans went as indentured servants to the Caribbean (primarily the English-speaking islands of the Caribbean) before 1840. Most were young men, with dreams of owning their own land or striking it rich quick, who would essentially sell years of their labor in exchange for passage to the islands. However, forceful indenture also provided part of the servants: contemporaries report that youngsters were sometimes tricked into servitude in order to be exploited in the colonies.

The landowners on the islands would pay for a servant's passage and then provide the servant with food, clothes, shelter and instruction during the agreed term. The servant would then be required to work in the landowner's field for a term of bondage (usually four to seven years). Servants were not allowed to marry without the master's permission. Servants could own personal property. They could also complain to a local magistrate about mistreatment that exceeded community norms. However, a servant's contract could be sold or given away by his master.

After the servant's term was complete he became independent and was paid "freedom dues". These payments could take the form of land which would give the servant the opportunity to become an independent farmer or a free laborer. As free men with little money they became a political force that stood in opposition to the rich planters.

Indentured servitude was a common part of the social landscape in England, Scotland and Ireland during the 17th century. During the 17th century, British and Irish went to Barbados as both masters and as indentured servants. Some went as prisoners. During the Wars of the Three Kingdoms many Scottish and Irish prisoners of war were sold as indentured laborers to the colonies. There were also reports of kidnappings of youngsters to work as servants.

After 1660, fewer indentured servants came from Europe to the Caribbean. Newly freed servant farmers, given 25–50 acres of land, were unable to make a living because profitable sugar plantations needed to cover hundreds of acres. However, profit could still be made through the tobacco trade, which was what these small 25-acre farms did to live comfortably. The landowners’ reputation as cruel masters became a deterrent to the potential indentured servant. In the 17th century, the islands became known as death traps, as between 33 and 50 percent of indentured servants died before they were freed, many from yellow fever, malaria and other diseases.

=== Indian servants after abolition ===
When slavery ended in the British Empire in 1833, plantation owners turned to indentured servitude for inexpensive labor. These servants arrived from across the globe; the majority came from India where many indentured laborers came from to work in colonies requiring manual labor. As a result, today Indo-Caribbean people make up a plurality in Guyana, Trinidad and Tobago and Suriname, and a substantial minority in Jamaica, Grenada, Barbados, St Lucia and other Caribbean islands. The British government finally ended indentures in the Caribbean in 1917 by prohibiting the further transportation of persons from India for purposes of servitude for debt.

== See also ==
- Slavery in the colonial United States
- Indentured servitude in Pennsylvania
- Irish indentured servants
- Indentured servitude in Virginia
- Indian slave trade in the American Southeast
- United States labor law
- Slavery in the colonial history of the United States
