= Indentured servitude in Pennsylvania =

Indentured servitude in Pennsylvania (1682-1820s): The institution of indentured servitude has a significant place in the history of labor in Pennsylvania. From the founding of the colony (1681/2) to the early post-revolution period (1820s), indentured servants contributed considerably to the development of agriculture and various industries in Pennsylvania. Moreover, Pennsylvania itself has a notable place in the broader history of indentured servitude in North America. As Cheesman Herrick stated, "This system of labor was more important to Pennsylvania than it was to any other colony or state; it continued longer in Pennsylvania than elsewhere."

== Trends ==
The features of indentured servitude in Pennsylvania, like other colonies, underwent a series of transformations. For example, indentured servitude initially possessed a patriarchal character. Under the "head right" system, prospective proprietors could receive 50 acres (20 ha) for each "head" (servant/laborer) they brought over, with 50 acres (20 ha) being given to the servant once his/her indenture had expired. Most of the indentured servants that migrated to Pennsylvania at this time had some form of acquaintanceship with their masters. In turn, many of the contracts established between the masters and servants were oral and based upon certain "customs" of the home country. In addition, "immigrants in bondage" were "criminals" in England. This could mean a great many things. Many were non-conformists, had problems with the church, or had committed an offense as small as stealing a loaf of bread.

Yet, as time progressed the system became more "systematized," acquiring certain standardized procedures and regulations. The transition to written contracts reflected this development. In addition, such factors as poverty, dislocation, personal ambition, or criminal activity "produced" enough indentured servants to support a well-functioning market structure. Indeed, the institution of indentured servitude assumed the characteristics of a "modern labor market."

During the early period, much of the work undertaken by indentured servants related to agriculture and "taming" the wilderness (e.g. clearing forests). As industry developed, however, the demand for skilled labor increased; while agriculture still demanded indentured servants, the emergence of different industries required a diverse workforce. Free labor at this stage proved scarce and highly expensive, thus compelling colonists to seek an alternative via servants (and slaves).

Moreover, the origins and "types" of servants changed over time. Whereas indentured servants in late-17th and early-18th centuries migrated predominantly from England, Scotland, and Wales (Great Britain after 1707 Acts of Union), a majority of those in the mid-to-late 18th century consisted of Irish and German/Palatinate immigrants. With this "transition" in the national compositions of indentured servants came a shift in the particular "form" of the institution. In the 1720s the "redemptionist system" began to replace the older structure, a subject to be discussed below. This type of indentured servitude provided the greatest source of labor by the end of the 18th century.

The collapse of indentured servitude has been a subject of debate. A categorization of this debate could roughly divide the positions into "demand" and "supply." Those on the former, such as Sharon Salinger and Cheesman Herrick, have argued that the system collapsed as a result of a growing free labor supply in Pennsylvania: employers found free labor less expensive and more flexible than indentured servitude. Thus, the demand of employers essentially determined the rise and fall of the system.

Scholars arguing on the "supply" side have maintained that the ability of migrants to finance their passage to the "new world" ultimately undermined the system. David Galenson, for example, said the fact "that the great nineteenth-century migration of Europeans to the Americas was composed of free individuals and families appears to have been a consequence of both falling transportation costs and rising European income levels." Farley Grubb approached the issue from a different perspective; he contended that the demand model fails to provide a satisfactory explanation because employers still paid high prices for indentured (redemptioner) servants. Analyzing specifically German migration in the 19th century, Grubb attributed the end of indentured servitude to the ability of immigrant families in the United States to finance the transportation of relatives through remittances, a "system" facilitated by the declining price of passage–fare.

Without evaluating the merits of these explanations, the following article seeks to outline various components surrounding indentured servitude in Pennsylvania, dealing (roughly) with time period of 1682–1820. Of course, a number of these aspects were not unique to Pennsylvania, but, rather, represent features characterizing the institution generally. Yet, the following information will also show that Pennsylvanian society and government, like that of other colonies, had their own particular ways of appropriating the institution of indentured servitude.

== Types of Indentured Servitude ==
Indentured servitude can be described as an arrangement in which one party agrees to serve another for a certain number of years in exchange for an initial payment or monetary outlay. In colonial and early-republican Pennsylvania, statutes governing the institution established both protections for and restrictions upon indentured servants. While masters could not wield unlimited authority over their servants, the latter was nevertheless subject to various constraints upon their freedom. In fact, indentured servants essentially bore the status of property. However, while these details help in generally understanding indentured servitude, the various forms of the system need to be mentioned as well.

=== Indentured Servants ===
While the category of indentured servant can apply to all the variations of the institution, scholars have also attached a more precise meaning to the term. Depending on the context, the "indentured servant" usually refers to servant-migrants whose contracts were arranged before the voyage to the colonies. The term may also describe colonial residents who indentured themselves or their relations. Of course, features of this type overlap with aspects of others.

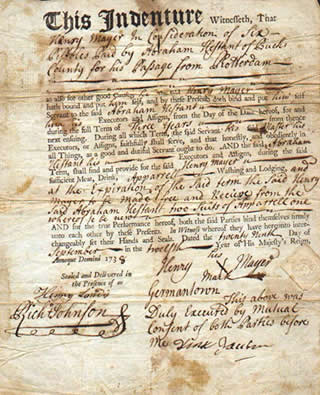
An indentured servant's contract

With regard to the "migrant variety," persons in Great Britain (including Ireland) seeking transportation across the Atlantic would "finance" the trip by entering into contractual agreements with a merchant. In exchange for passage to the colonies/state, these individuals "sold" their labor to the "master of the ship." The latter, in turn, would recover the cost of the passage by selling the indentured servant's contract (labor) to a buyer in the colonies.

During the negotiation process, agents or merchants would consider a number of variables to project the value of the servant in the colonies/states. Such factors as "productivity," skills in a particular trade, gender, and the provision of education determined the conditions stipulated in the contract, especially the length of service. The inclusion of freedom dues, provisions granted to the servants after expiration of the contract, also affected the terms; freedom dues beyond that required by law would increase the "implicit" cost of the servant, potentially requiring an increase in the length indenture. Merchants or agents, therefore, negotiated contracts expected to (at least) recover the costs of the voyage. Farley Grubb has identified this practice as "forward-labor contracting," as the process aimed to determine the "future market values" of a commodity.

Once both parties agreed to a set of terms, the servant had to be "bound" before a magistrate or high official in Britain. Servants over twenty-one had to testify that the contract was voluntary; servants also had to testify that they had no obligations to other persons. William Moraley, who wrote an account of his experience as an indentured servant in Pennsylvania, noted that he and the agent "went before Sir Robert Bailis, Lord Mayor, where I was sworn as not being a married Person, or an Apprentice by Indenture."

Those under the age of twenty-one needed the consent of even higher officials, as well as the approval of his/her guardians. Most immigrant children "sold" by their parents were registered in Pennsylvania as "apprentices," with only a small portion being labeled as "servants." Certainly, apprenticeship and servitude differed in that the former required some sort of education. Although indentured servant contracts could stipulate the provision of "instruction," this condition was not necessary.

Yet, the boundary between child apprenticeship and servitude could prove quite ambiguous. Child servant contracts were sometimes converted to apprenticeships, and vice versa, upon "assignment" (or resale). In some cases children recorded as apprentices actually found themselves laboring in the fields instead of receiving the stipulated training. Whether a servant or apprentice, children usually held contracts that lasted until their reaching an age of maturity, twenty-one/two for males and eighteen for females.

These regulations on indentured servant contracts arose from a great controversy in Britain over practice of "spiriting," whereby an agent or merchant would indenture an individual by deceptive and coercive means. Indeed, the situation became problematic for those engaged in the trade as well, since persons who had originally consented to being indentured could accuse the agents or merchants of spiriting. The latter, without some official documentation, could not defend themselves against such charges. Further initiatives were taken by the Council of Foreign Plantations in 1664 to establish a registry office for outgoing servants. In spite of such efforts, however, spiriting remained an unsavory aspect of the indentured servitude trade. Registering servants failed to become a systematized procedure, as the process was voluntary (as well as required a fee). Most indentured servants emigrating from Britain in the 18th century carried the minimum of a written contract.

Pennsylvanian law established regulations for indentured servants without contracts. "Every such Servant being seventeen years of age or upwards, shall serve five years; And all those who shall be under seventeen years, of age, shall serve till they Come to the age of twenty-two." Masters of these indentured servants were required to "bring such Servant or Servants within three months time after their arrival before said Courts to be adjudged."

As for indentured colonists, the reasons for entering into such an arrangement varied. Colonists might indenture themselves or their relations in response to economic circumstances. For example, parents unable to financially support their children might place them under indenture, since the terms of the agreement usually specified the provisioning of "meat, drink, lodging and washing."

Colonists also became indentured servants as punishment for some form of transgression or debt. In the case of the latter, individuals could present a "petition" to the courts, whereby they would "admit" to the debt and agree to fulfill their obligations by indenturing themselves. The indenture could be granted to the creditor or another party who paid the servant's debt. Overall, however, only a small portion of the indentured servants in Pennsylvania derived from colony's residents.

=== Convicts, Vagabonds, Rogues, and the Undesirables ===
Those of the "criminal" or "meaner" sort comprised another form of indentured servitude. For these individuals, indentured servitude provided a "conditional" alternative to judicially prescribed punishments. By serving a certain number of years under indenture, such persons would legally absolve themselves of their crimes. However, if these servants reneged on their contracts and returned to the home country, they would be subject to the penalty of death.

"According to common law and the Habeas Corpus Act," as Abbot Smith noted, "it was illegal to inflict a penalty of exile or transportation. But it was not illegal to pardon a felon upon the condition that he transports himself out of the country, and the term of his exile might thus be fixed as the authorities desired." By the 18th century two major practices were employed to facilitate this conditional transportation, "the pleading of the clergy and the granting of royal pardons."

As the system developed, the royal pardon came to entail justices or a mayor/recorder submitting a list of "worthy" individuals to the secretary of state; if the list was approved, the king/court and the secretary would sign the document, thus granting the pardon. Those receiving such a pardon would "plead" in an open court and wait to be shipped to the colonies. Many would be shipped to the middle colonies, usually ending up at ports in Philadelphia or the Chesapeake Bay where they found their temporary new home on farms, English Estates, or in quarries. Depending on their violation their sentence could last 5 or 7 years, sometime less if they had a valuable trade such as a blacksmith.

The actual process of transporting convicts to the colonies fell into the hands of private merchants, though these individuals had to follow certain regulations. Merchants made their profits by selling the convicts as indentured servants. Seven years became the standard length of service for such contracts. Some merchants received additional payments from the Treasury or the "Home Counties" for "relieving" the country of these "unsavory" persons.

As noted, involvement in the business of convict-servant transportation came with a series of obligations. Merchants, for example, had to present a certificate signed by the captain of a ship to the Treasury or sheriffs of the "Home Counties" in order to receive their payments. To ensure that merchants would not facilitate the return of criminals before the expiration of the latter's contracts, the law governing the transportation of felons required merchants to "enter into bonds" of £40 per servant; should a malefactor violate the contract, the merchant would be responsible for the "recompense." The merchant or captain of the ship "doth also further Covenant that he will as soon as conveniently may be procure an Authentick Certificate from the Governour or the Chief Customehouse Officer of the Place whereto they shall be so transported of the Landing of such Offenders as aforesaid." These directives were not completely followed, though; indeed, some convicts were never sent abroad.

Transportation to the colonies also applied to so-called rogues, vagabonds, and other people of the "meaner" sort. The procedures for this practice, dating back to the Elizabethan era, had a similarity to that for convicts, with seven years being the standard period of indenture. Yet, most merchants shipping such individuals abroad actually did so outside of the dictates stipulated in the law. Instead, these persons were transported by orders of the authorities at the workhouses and hospitals in which former resided.

Certainly, though, the place of law in this system should not be discounted. In 1617, the Scottish Privy Council received a code from the English Star Chamber for regulating the "border counties." The thirteenth article of this code provided for the transportation of "lewd" characters. Later petitions made by magistrate of Edinburgh in the mid-to-late 17th century would further enforce this policy. In fact, the granting of warrants for the transportation of "lewd" persons became a "customary" procedure in Scotland.

The importation of such servants incited much controversy in the colonies. While this labor force had a market, a number of prominent voices expressed fears that the presence of these persons could degrade population, corrupt other servants, and undermined the stability of society. Some colonies, including Pennsylvania, attempted to pass laws that aimed to deter the importation of felons and the lowly sorts. However, the "home government" would roundly denounce and disallow the legal execution of these regulations.

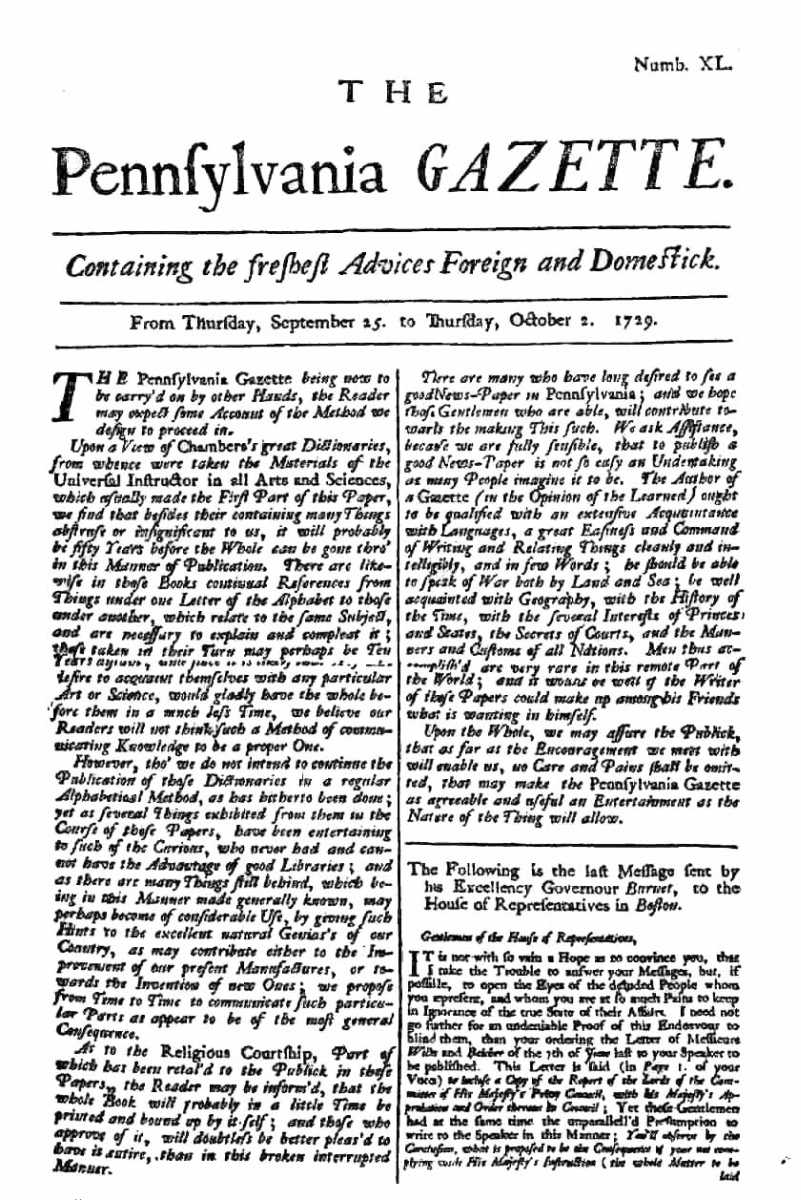

Benjamin Franklin stood among Pennsylvania's most vociferous critics of this type of servitude. In a famous article published in his Pennsylvania Gazette, Franklin sardonically derided the home government for "not suffer[ing] our mistaken Assemblies to make any Law for preventing or discouraging the Importation of Convicts from Great Britain, for this kind Reason, 'That such Laws are against the Publick Utility, as they tend to prevent the IMPROVEMENT and WELL PEOPLING of the Colonies.'" To convey the anxiety created by this practice, the author proposed that the colony transplant its own felons to Britain, specifically "in St. James Park, in the Spring Gardens and other Places of Pleasure about London; in the Gardens of all the Nobility and Gentry throughout the Nation; but particularly in the Gardens of the Prime Ministers, the Lords of Trade and Members of Parliament; for to them we are most particularly obliged." Franklin thus repudiated notion that indenturing these "Human Serpents" redounded to the benefit of "Public Utility."

The law to which Franklin referred had been submitted to (and disapproved by) the Board of Trade in 1748. However, many its features stemmed as far back as the session of 1721–1722. The Pennsylvania Assembly at that time passed an act placing a £5 duty on each convict imported into the colony. Similar to the law in Britain, merchants or captains were also required to "enter into bonds" of £50 per felon imported.

The act further stipulated that ships carrying servants must furnish, within twenty-four hours after landing, one or more justices of the peace with a list of all those being imported, including information on the servants' crimes. If the justices found such individuals fit to enter the colony, they would grant the merchant or captain a "certificate of permission." Violation of this statute made servants free, regardless of previous contractual agreements.

Later sessions of the Pennsylvania Assembly would either reinforce the statutes of the 1722 law or expand its scope. For example, the session of 1729–1730 passed an act extending regulations for convicts to such groups as vagrants, lunatics, infants, and the impotent. Pennsylvania legislators showed apprehension toward sending these laws to the Board of Trade for approval, however. In 1748 the Assembly finally decided to submit such a bill to the board; of course, the legislature had delayed disclosure of the law (passed in 1743) until the five-year time limit for such procedures expired.

The Assembly's concerns were warranted, as the Broad of Trade dismissed the 1743/1748 bill and ordered the nullification of the other acts that had "never been presented to the Crown for approbation as they ought to have been." In spite of these directives, the legislature maintained the 1730 law that placed a £5 levy on each of the specified persons, with a 1749 supplementary act providing for the collection of the duties. Such regulations and procedures retained the force of law until 1789, when state legislation barred the importation of convicts and the "indignant poor."

Laws regulating the importation of the "undesirables" did not completely dispel fears, though. Colonists still felt apprehensive about the potential penetration of convict runaways from Maryland, which had been a chief location for transported felons. This situation partly explains the various advertisements in Pennsylvania newspapers for "fugitive servants" from Maryland.

=== Redemptioner System ===
Emerging in the 18th century, the redemptionist system allowed indebted migrants to avoid indenture by repaying the costs of their passage within a certain period of time after arrival in the colony. However, if the migrant proved unable to reimburse the merchant for the passage, the former was sold as an indentured servant for the specified amount of the voyage. This form of indentured servitude had a particularly prominent role in the Pennsylvania market; Philadelphia became a chief port in which redemptioner servants were procured by buyers from across and outside of the colony/state.

During the early stages of the system, redemptioners had the liberty to leave the ships and seek out relations who would repay their debts. However, such an arrangement proved problematic, as some redemptioners did not return. A merchant could take legal action, but this course of action could consume much time and did not always bring the defected redemptioner to "justice." As Grubb noted, "They [the merchants] eventually solved the problem by keeping redemptioners on board until payment was rendered and by requiring payment within 10 to 14 days of arrival." While the period of repayment was later extended to 30 days, this policy increased the likelihood of the redemptioner being indentured, since such constraints inhibit his/her ability to make contact with relations.

Whereas servants indentured in Britain had a fixed contract length before their sale in the colonies/states, an indentured redemptioner would negotiate the terms of the contract with the buyers. Gottlieb Mittelberger, a German migrant who travelled with redemptioners on a ship to Philadelphia, has provided a description of this process,

[T]hey [the redemptioners] negotiate with them [the buyers] as to the length of the period for which they will go into service in order to pay off their passage, the whole amount of which they generally still owe. When an agreement has been reached, adult persons by written contract bind themselves to serve for three, four, five, or six years, according to their health and age. The very young, between the ages of ten and fifteen, have to serve until they are twenty-one, however.

Thus, unlike the above forms of indentured servitude, the terms of sale for redemptioner servitude had a "fixed" price but a "variable" length of service.

Other aspects distinguished redemptioner system from its indentured counterparts as well. Among these points of contrast, the "most remarkable difference between the two," as Abbot Smith noted, "was...that the redemptionist system applied generally to people who emigrated in whole families, bringing their goods and chattels with them and seeking a new home." Certain merchants preferred this arrangement because it diffused the risks and losses stemming from mortality rates during the passage. If a migrant were to die after the "halfway" point of the voyage, the other members of a family would assume the expenses of that person's passage. The Pennsylvania Assembly eventually passed a law in 1765 that forbade this practice, though masters of ships attempted to circumvent its restrictions.

German migrants accounted for a majority of redemptioners, with those from the Palatinate being the most numerous within this group. Palatinate redemptioners would descend the Rhine, crossing several principalities, until they reached the port of Rotterdam in Holland. An agent, termed a "Newlander," sometimes led these journeys. Once the groups reached Rotterdam, they sought passage to the "new land" through one of merchants or companies stationed at the port; those who could not immediately afford the fare entered into the agreements specified above. After disembarking from the port, the ships carrying the redemptioners stopped at an English port, usually Cowes, to obtain official clearance to sail to the colonies. After the revolution, this latter formality was no longer necessary.

While the terms of the redemptionist system allowed those without financial resources to obtain passage to the colonies/states, some who were able to pay the fare nevertheless opted to enter into indenture. Robert Heavner has noted that these individuals intended to use their indentures to acquire some form of education, which usually involved learning the English language. Indeed, a provision for education was not uncommon in the contracts of indentured redemptioners in general.

The system of redemptioner servitude also appeared among migrants from the Britain. In some cases British redemptioners traveled on the same ship as their indentured counterparts. For example, an advertisement in the Pennsylvania Gazette read:

TO BE SOLD, THE Indentures of a few SERVANTS and REDEMPTIONERS, arrived in the Ship Philadelphia, from LONDONDERRY. For Terms, apply to Captain John WINNING, on board said Ship, at William Allen, Esquire Wharff. January 10, 1774.

Obviously, the redemptioners in this case were those unable to repay the merchant in the specified period.

== Runaway servants ==
Heavner has noted that laws "dealing with shirking [and] running away were in essence laws against 'stealthe' or theft of the master's property—his right to the servant's labor services." The formation and elaboration of such laws, in other words, reflects the emergence of a commodities market system. Thus, fugitive servant advertisements would appear alongside runaway slave notices, as both represented (in different ways) a denial of the owner's rights to property.

Advertisements for runaway servants generally contained a description of the individual and the monetary reward/compensation involved in his/her apprehension. As an illustration, a notice in the American Weekly Mercury read in part:

Run away from Joseph Townshend and Thomas Hayward of Chester Pennsylvania, the 13th of this Instant May. Two Servant Men, the one named Edmund Jones, a Shropshire Man, aged 26 Years, a Tall slender Man, long Vissage, brown hair, having on a felt Hat...a blew Jacket and Leather Breeches...The other named Thomas Coombes...aged about 22 Years...round Vissage, and a flat Nose, a Scare on his right Cheek occasioned by falling into the Fire...Whoever shall take up and secure the said Servants so that their said Master may have them again shall have 5 Pounds Reward for each of them and Reasonable Charges paid by us.

The advertisement might make an additional comment at the end of the description to better facilitate the capture of the servant.

As means of regulating the movement of servants, Pennsylvania law stipulated that such persons must travel with a pass or their indenture. "Unknown" or suspicious individuals that could not furnish such a document were subject to confinement in a workhouse. The sheriff's office would then "advertise" the apprehended person in an attempt to inform the master (if there was a master) of his/her whereabouts. If a master did reclaim the servant, the former would assume all charges involved in the latter's capture and captivity.

Servants attempted to avoid apprehension by creating or procuring forged passes. Advertisements for runaways sometimes mentioned that the servants could be carrying these false "freedom pass." A notice in the Pennsylvania Gazette, for example, stated that a Robert Beverlin "has a counterfeit pass with him, signed with the name Veazey, done by a schoolmaster, in New Castle prison." Another strategy involved altering passes issued by masters, usually changing the stipulated "time of return.". One runaway advertisement even warned that the servant, Thomas Mason, had "his old indentures with him, with which 'tis supposed he will endeavour to pass."

The penalty for runaways entailed the lengthening of the time served. By the 18th century, Pennsylvania law stipulated "five days for every days absence, after the expiration of...Servitude," with the additional provision that the captured runaway make "Satisfaction for the Damages, costs, and charges." After securing the runaway servant, the master would submit to the courts a claim enumerating the days of the servant's absence and the expenditures involved in his/her capture. The courts, in turn, would determine the extra time or "money charge" required in order to compensate the master, though a money payment was unlikely. It was, however, likely that the servant would be punished for their absence by means of whipping.

== Voyage and Arrival ==
The voyage of servants to the colonies/states was quite onerous and hazardous. For German redemptioners, the journey proved especially long and arduous, as they had to traverse down the Rhine to Rotterdam, paying tolls at thirty-six custom houses along the way. Once in Holland, they faced a seven- to twelve-week voyage to the colonies/states. Nevertheless, servants of various types faced (in different ways) many hardships in their trip across the Atlantic. Insufficient food provisions and the spread of disease represented two of the most serious (and common) afflictions involved in the passage.

With regard to the former, unscrupulous merchants seeking to increase their profit even further might have supplied their ships with meager provisions. Such practices appeared most commonly among transporters of redemptioners, though similar depredations can be found on the ships of other servants. As Sharon Salinger observed, "Many masters [carrying redemptioners] were notorious for providing inadequate provisions for only the first half of the trip and then virtually starving their captives to the journey's end." Since transportation rules (prior to 1765 for ships landing in Pennsylvania) specified that families assumed responsibility for the cost of a deceased member only if that member died after the halfway point, providing adequate provisions for the first half of the journey helped the merchant ensure a "return" on the "investment."

An inadequate supply of food could have resulted from less sinister causes as well. Masters of ships occasionally misjudged the necessary supply. Shortfalls in provisions might have also been due to the poor quality of the food, as opposed to a failure to adequately supply the ship. After a number of weeks the food spoiled to point of being inedible, thus accounting for reductions in the distributed rations. Aside from the specific reason of insufficient provisions, the issue remained an unpleasant "theme" in the passage to the colonies/states.

The spread of diseases among the passengers represented another "misery" of the journey. Mittelberger provided a description of the situation:

On one of these voyages a father often becomes infected by his wife and children, or a mother by her small children, or even both parents by their children, or sometimes whole families one by the other, so that many times numerous corpses lie on the cots next to those who are still alive, especially when contagious diseases rage on board.

Sickly migrants and servants became an issue of concern for the colonies receiving them, with the specter of contagious diseases demanding a course of action.

In the face of this alarming situation, Pennsylvania officials began to debate the idea of quarantining those diseased passengers for the period of their recovery. In 1741, Governor George Thomas petitioned the Assembly to create a pesthouse for the ill as an alternative to keeping them on board the ship. After the Pennsylvania legislature approved the idea, funds were appropriated to purchase Province Island, at the mouth of the Schuylkill River, as the location for the pesthouse and hospital. While such an initiative contributed to preventing the spread of diseases from afflicted migrants, the conditions on the island, according to one account, created the image of "a land of the living dead, a vault full of living corpses."

Pennsylvania officials made further efforts to reduce the rate of disease among passengers by addressing the conditions on board the ship. The Assembly argued that a quarantine merely served as an immediate response to a contagious cargo; the central cause of the problem involved the crowded quarters of ships, especially those carrying the Irish and Germans. Consequently, the legislature passed a law in 1750 to limit the number of passengers per ship. According to the statutes of the act, six feet of "Bed Place" was required for every four "whole freights," with a passenger above fourteen years of age constituting a "whole freight." In 1765 the legislature passed a supplemental law that added a "vertical" standard to "horizontal" space specified in the previous act, stipulating three feet nine inches of "Bed Place" at the forepart of the ship and two feet nine inches in the cabin and steerage. Moreover, vessels that carried emigrants were to be fumigated and washed with vinegar twice per week; ships transporting Germans were to have a surgeon on board to care for the ill.

However, the actual implementation of these laws proved difficult, and the results of such legislation were limited. Lacking the means of enforcement, as well as support from the home government, many of the baneful practices involved in the trade continued. As Salinger observed, "Without the interference of colonial officials, merchants' behavior went unchecked and the route to the promised land was lined with the horrors of disease and death."

Upon arrival in Pennsylvania, merchants or captains of the ships transporting the human cargo were required to register a list of passengers with the mayor's office, a magistrate or recorder. By 1717, masters of ships carrying German and other non-British redemptioners had the additional obligation of furnishing an "account" of the "character" of the individuals on board; furthermore, the emigrants had to "proclaim" before a magistrate or recorder their allegiance to "his Majesty and his Government." Those transporting convicts, as noted, were required to provide one or more justices of the peace with a list enumerating the passengers and their respective transgressions.

After these procedures, the master of a ship could begin to sell the servants. "[T]he captains or merchants," as Herrick described, "usually inserted in the newspapers advertisements which gave descriptions of the passengers for sale, their nationality, age, sex, and the service for which they were said to be fitted." As an illustration, one such advertisement in the Pennsylvania Gazette read:

SERVANTS, Just imported in the Ship Hugh and James, Captain McCarthy, from Ireland, and to be sold by CONYNGHAM and NESBITT, A PARCEL of likely young Men, Women, and Boys, among which are, Shoemakers, Taylors, Linen, Worsted and Stockings Weavers, Blacksmiths, Nailors, Carpenters, Joyners, Butchers, Gardiners, Distillers, Millers, a Mill wright, Soap boiler, Sugar boiler, Sadler, Brazier, Upholsterer, Tobacco Spinner, Snuff maker, Currier, Barber, Cooper, Bricklayer, Breeches maker, and a Printer.

In some cases the terms of indenture were mentioned in the advertisement as well.

The sale of indentured servants usually occurred on the ship, with the servants being "displayed" to the prospective buyers. The latter would evaluate the physical characteristics of the servants as well as inquire about their respective skills. When buyers found a particular servant fitting for their purposes, they would pay the merchant or captain the cost of the voyage and take possession of the indenture. The new master was then obligated to register the servant with the mayor's office, a magistrate or recorder. Servants not sold by the intended departure date would be housed in the merchant's buildings, where they would wait until their indentures were purchased.

== See also ==
- Gottlieb Mittelberger
- Sally Brant
- Slavery in the colonial United States
- Indentured servitude in the Americas
  - Redemptioner
  - Indentured servitude in Virginia
- Indian slave trade in the American Southeast

== Bibliography ==
- "Advertisement." American Weekly Mercury. 13 October 1726,
- "Advertisement." The Pennsylvania Gazette. 29 January 1751.
- "Advertisement." The Pennsylvania Gazette. 17 October 1754.
- "Advertisement." The Pennsylvania Gazette. 3 April 1755.
- "Advertisement." The Pennsylvania Gazette. 10 June 1766.
- "Advertisement." The Pennsylvania Gazette. 12 June 1774.
- Franklin, Benjamin. "To the Printers of the Gazette," The Pennsylvania Gazette. 9 May 1751.
- Galenson, David. "The Rise and Fall of Indentured Servitude in the Americas: An Economic Analysis." The Journal of Economic History 44, no. 1 (March 1984): 1–26.
- Grubb, Farley. "The Market for Indentured Immigrants: Evidence of the Efficiency of Forward-Labor Contracting in Philadelphia, 1745–1773." The Journal of Economic History 45, no. 4 (December 1985): 855–868.
- Grubb, Farley. "The Auction of Redemptioner Servants, Philadelphia, 1771–1804: An Economic Analysis." The Journal of Economic History 48, no. 3 (September 1988): 583–603.
- Grubb, Farley. "The End of European Immigrant Servitude in the United States: An Economic Analysis of Market Collapse, 1772–1835." The Journal of Economic History 54, no.4 (December 1994): 794–824.
- Heavner, Robert. "Indentured Servitude: The Philadelphia Market, 1771–1773." The Journal of Economic History 38, no. 3 (September 1978): 701–1773.
- Heavner, Robert. Economic Aspects of Indentured Servitude in Colonial Pennsylvania. New York: Arno Press, 1978.
- Herrick, Cheesman. White Servitude in Pennsylvania: Indentured and Redemption Labor in Colony and Commonwealth. New York: Negro University Press, 1969.
- Jordan, Don and Michael Walsh. White Cargo: The Forgotten History of Britain's White Slaves in America. New York: New York University Press, 2008.
- Mittelberger, Gottlieb. Journey to Pennsylvania. Trans., Oscar Handlin and John Clive. Cambridge, Harvard University Press, 1960.
- Moraley, William. The Infortunate: The Voyage and Adventures of William Moraley, an Indentured Servant. Eds., Susan Klepp and Billy Smith. University Park: The Pennsylvania State University Press, 1992.
- Salinger, Sharon. "To serve well and faithfully": Labor and Indentured servants in Pennsylvania, 1682-1800. Cambridge: Cambridge University Press, 1987.
- Van Der Zee, John. Bound Over: Indentured Servitude and American Conscience. New York: Simon and Schuster, 1985.
