= Sally Brant =

Indentured servant

Sally Brant (born c.1778) was an American white indentured servant in the household of Elizabeth Sandwith Drinker and Henry Drinker in Philadelphia. She gave birth out of wedlock to a child of mixed race, in defiance of legal restrictions on the sexual activity of indentured servants and strong social prejudice against interracial relationships.

== Early life in indentured servitude ==
Sally Brant started working for the Drinker family when she was ten years old, after the death of her mother and her mother's remarriage. She was one of several servants in the Drinker household, including indentured servants, free servants who lived in the house, and free day workers. She fulfilled maid's duties while the Drinkers resided in the city, but also performed agricultural labor for them during the summers, which the household spent at their plantation, Clearfield. Elizabeth Drinker thought that Brant was a good servant, but she observed that as Brant entered her teens, she began flirting “and worse” with men.

In 1794, sixteen-year-old Sally Brant became pregnant. When confronted by Elizabeth Drinker, Brant named the father as Joe Gibbs, a free black man who worked as the Drinkers’ coach driver. Elizabeth Drinker reacted with “great anxiety of mind,” anger, and embarrassment. The Drinkers fired Gibbs to limit his further interaction with Brant, but they did not press any charges against him in court. Embarrassed by her servant's conduct, Elizabeth Drinker forced Brant to leave Philadelphia to give birth in Clearfield, in Germantown, Pennsylvania which was then a largely rural area well beyond the Philadelphia city limits.

When the child was born in March 1795, Brant named her Hannah Gibbs, thereby acknowledging her daughter's paternity. This further angered Drinker because Brant seemed to show no remorse over her actions. Elizabeth Drinker complained in her diary that "(Brant) appears to be full of Glee as if nothing ailed her". Drinker changed the child's name to Catherine Clearfield, to obscure her parentage, and refused to let Joe Gibbs see his daughter. When Brant was brought back to the Drinker home in Philadelphia, her daughter remained in Germantown in the charge of a series of wet nurses. First, Mary Courtney, the wife of the Drinkers’ gardener, cared for the baby for a short time, until the new gardener's wife, Mrs. George Fry, replaced her. When the Frys tired of the responsibility, Drinker contracted with Sally Morris, a black woman, to nurse the baby. Brant's daughter died at seven months old. Historian Merrill Smith, claims that "Elizabeth [Drinker] may have felt a little guilty, she believed she had done her duty and acted responsibly in her capacity as Sally's mistress."

As was common practice with indentured servitude in Pennsylvania, Brant was required to serve additional time, beyond her original contract of indenture, to pay for the expenses of her pregnancy, her recovery after birth, and the cost of the nurses hired to care for her child. Sally Brant left the Drinkers after fulfilling 8 years of service, on June 15, 1796, then 18 years old.

== After indentured servitude ==
In 1798, Brant married a barber with the last name of Shearer, and had at least three more children. She continued to visit the Drinker household regularly for several years, until at least 1806.

When the Drinkers' great-grandson, Henry Drinker Biddle, published an edited version of Elizabeth's diary in 1889, he left out key aspects of Sally Brant's experiences as Elizabeth had recorded them. Historians without access to Drinker's complete diary long assumed that Sally Brant and Joe Gibbs were both white. It served as a vivid illustration of the lack of control that indentured servants, especially women, had over their lives. Following the recovery of the original diary, Brant's story is now also recognized as a rare and important example of the consequences that an illicit, mixed-race relationship carried for an eighteenth-century servant.
