= Indentured servitude in Virginia =

Indentured servitude in continental North America began in the Colony of Virginia in 1609. Initially created as means of funding voyages for European workers to the New World, the institution dwindled over time as the labor force was replaced with enslaved Africans. Servitude became a central institution in the economy and society of many parts of colonial British America. Abbot Emerson Smith, a leading historian of indentured servitude during the colonial period, estimated that between one-half and two-thirds of all white immigrants to the British colonies between the Puritan migration of the 1630s and the American Revolution came under indenture. For the colony of Virginia, specifically, more than two-thirds of all white immigrants (male and female) arrived as indentured servants or transported convict bond servants.

== Origins ==
Indentured servitude first appeared in use in Virginia in 1609. Lands newly acquired from Powhatan Indians by white settlers required large amounts of tedious labor in order to transform into profit-producing tobacco farms. The most critical economic problem facing early investors in the Virginia Company and the settlers they sent to North America was recruiting and motivating an adequate labor force. Initial efforts to build a labor force yielded disappointing results. Passage fares to Virginia in the early seventeenth century were high relative to the annual wages of English servants in husbandry or hired agricultural laborers. Few prospective migrants were able to pay the cost of their voyage out of their own accumulated savings. To resolve this issue, the Virginia Company decided to use its own funds to advance the cost of passage to prospective settlers. The company's advance took the form of a loan to the migrants, who contracted to repay this debt out of their net earnings in America. The company went on to design three different forms of servitude contracts.

== Three forms of servitude contracts ==
The first indentured servitude contract, 1609–1619: The first form of indentured servitude contract was designed and implemented in 1609 and was used until 1619. Under this contract, the Virginia Company's funds were used to pay transportation costs for immigrants. In exchange, the immigrants were required to work directly for the company once they arrived in Virginia. The contracts also stipulated that in return for their labor in Virginia, the immigrants would become investors in the company enterprise, with claim to a share in the division of the company's profits. Immigrants would receive their share at the end of their seven-year labor contract. This arrangement was largely unpopular amongst laborers due to the living and working conditions. The men were required to live and work communally under "quasi-military" conditions. The tasks assigned to the laborers were arduous and the food was "scanty". Some workers chose to run away to live with the Indians. The company felt that this action threatened the continued survival of their enterprise and reacted forcefully to the crime. Recaptured laborers were subject to capital punishments that included being hung, burned to death, or shot.

The second indentured servitude contract, 1619–1620: By 1619, however, a new system had been introduced. The Virginia Company still paid for the transportation costs of the laborers, but the laborers were no longer contracted to work exclusively for the company once they arrived. Instead, free planters in the colony would rent the new laborers from the company for a year at a fixed rate, in addition to covering their maintenance costs during that year. The Company believed that this system would yield a number of advantages. The new immigrants’ placement with established planters would provide them with a place to live immediately after arrival, so the company would not be responsible for funding their maintenance once in Virginia any longer. Additionally, the established planters would train the laborers so that when their year of private service expired, they would have the skills necessary to provide for themselves in these new conditions and socio-political structure. Issues arose however, when the value of labor rose sharply due to the tobacco boom. Private employers began trying to acquire additional labor for their tobacco farms by enticing laborers on other farms with promises of shorter terms of service. The prevalence of this practice became so severe that in 1619 the general assembly had issued an order that stipulated that indentured servants had to remain in service to the original planter who rented them for their entire contracted term of service. The company's new rental policies also introduced an additional principal-agent relationship between the company and the private planters. The company became concerned that there were insufficient incentives for the planters to adequately maintain the health and wellbeing of laborers, since they only rented them for one year. High rates of mortality and instances of runaways became the economic burden of the company, which maintained legal ownership of the servants during their rental tenures.

The third indentured servitude contract, 1620-early 1700s: The company created a third form of indentured servitude in which immigrants transported at the company's expense from England to Virginia. The contracts of the immigrants were then sold outright to planters. These contracts bound the immigrants to labor for fixed terms of years. Once the planters purchased these contracts from the importer at the docks, they could either keep the servants as a source of labor for the full contract term or they could sell the contract to another planter.

== Decline and the role of African slavery ==
By 1650, there were about 300 Africans living in Virginia. They were still considered to be indentured servants, like the approximately 4000 white indentured people, since a slave law was not passed in the colony until 1661.

At the turn of the century, an increase in the Atlantic slave trade enabled planters to purchase enslaved labor, in lieu of bonded labor (indentured servants and convict bond servants). As demand for skilled indentured servants increased, attitudes about the institution also changed. Skilled indentures were able to sell their craftsmanship once they became freedmen, and therefore earned more income than the unskilled indentures who came before them. These new indentured servants were therefore less likely to cause revolts and the concerns of the gentry then shifted from white bond laborers to black enslaved laborers. This marks the early eighteenth century as not only a shift in the composition of the labor force but also as a shift in perceptions of black laborers, who by this point in time were predominantly enslaved.

== See also ==
- First Africans in Virginia
- Indentured servitude in the Americas
  - Redemptioner
  - Indentured servitude in Pennsylvania
- Indian slave trade in the American Southeast
- Slavery in the colonial United States
