= Balthasar Friedrich Leizelt =

German artist and copperplate engraver

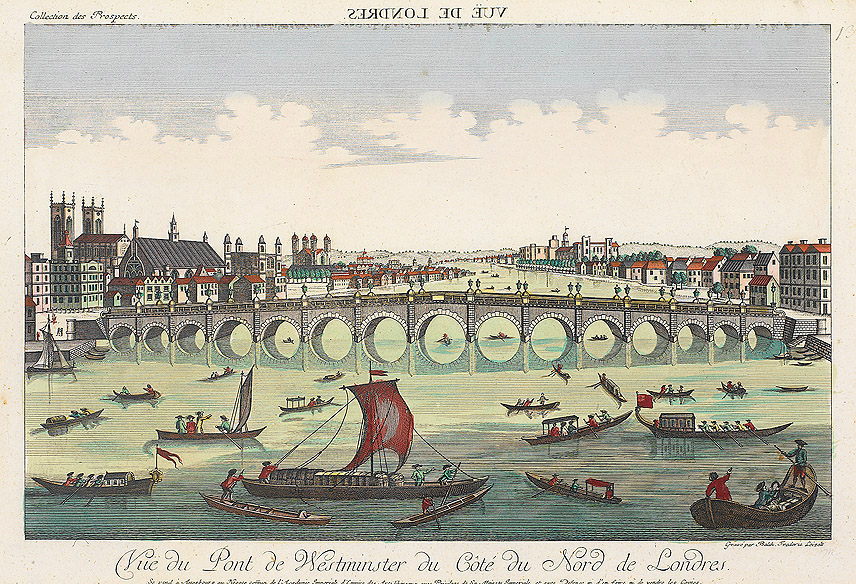
Westminster Bridge, London

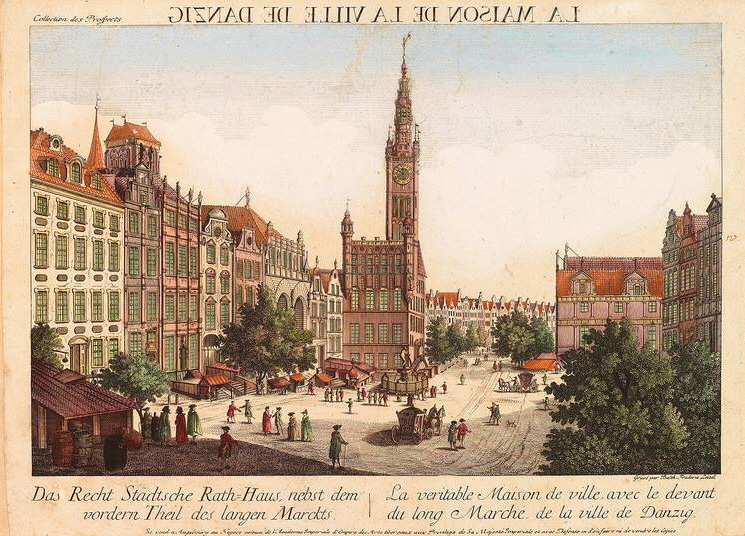
Town Hall, Danzig

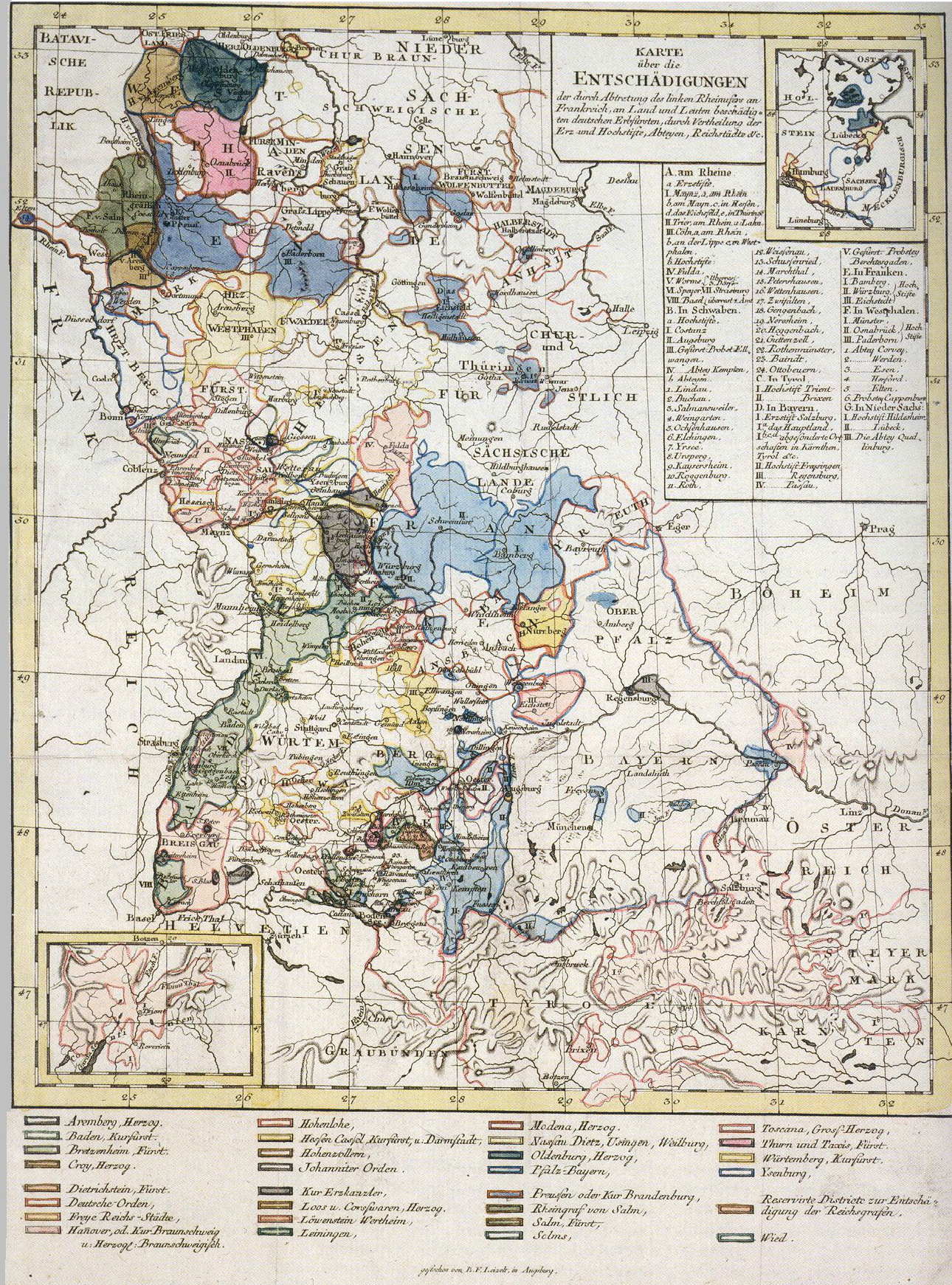
Karte über die Entschädigungen

Balthasar Friedrich Leizelt (also spelled Leizel, active 1750–1800) was a German artist and copperplate engraver working from Augsburg.

Leizelt produced a series of European and American scenic views at a time when pictures of foreign countries and people were popular and designed for use in optical viewers. As is normal for these prints the series title is a mirror image because optical viewers made use of mirrors which reversed the image. The Age of Enlightenment sparked a great interest in science, so that optical toys and devices became a standard form of drawing-room entertainment in the 1700s and 1800s. Light, perspective, and multiple images were cleverly combined to create the illusion of moving pictures. He also engraved maps.
