= Indian slave trade in the American Southeast =

Native Americans living in the American Southeast were enslaved through warfare and purchased by European colonists in North America throughout the 17th, 18th, and 19th centuries, as well as held in captivity through Spanish-organized forced labor systems in Florida. Emerging British colonies in Virginia, Carolina (later, North and South Carolina), and Georgia imported Native Americans and incorporated them into chattel slavery systems, where they intermixed with slaves of African descent, who would eventually come to outnumber them. The settlers' demand for slaves affected communities as far west as present-day Illinois and the Mississippi River and as far south as the Gulf Coast. European settlers exported tens of thousands of enslaved Native Americans outside the region to New England and the Caribbean.

Natives were sometimes used as labor on plantations or as servants to wealthy colonist families, other times they were used as interpreters for European traders. The policies on the treatment and slavery of Native Americans varied from colony to colony in the Southeast. The Native American slave trade in the southeast relied on Native Americans trapping and selling other Natives into slavery; this trade between the colonists and the Native Americans had a profound effect on the shaping and nature of slavery in the Southeast. While Natives enslaved other Natives prior to the contact with the European settlers, such Native slaves were held as personal servants or to perform other tasks, not as chattel slaves. Slaves were of little or no economic significance for Native societies. Following British settlement, a number of Native societies, armed with European firearms, oriented themselves around waging war to capture other Native people, selling them into chattel slavery. The Southeastern plantations that European settlers established greatly relied on the exploitation of enslaved human beings, with slaves comprising a key component of their workforce. The slave trade and warfare that facilitated it diminished the numbers of Native peoples in the region and drove many other Native societies to flee their homelands, breaking apart existing communities and eventually leading to a new map of peoples and ethnic groups in the region.

== Structure of the trade ==
Slavery existed in all societies worldwide from prehistory, see History of slavery for a global perspective and Slavery in Pre-Columbian America for information specific to the Americas. Slavery practices continued and evolved as Europeans came to North America in large numbers starting in the 1600s.

In many cases the European colonists would trade with Native Americans: giving them goods and weapons, such as the flintlock musket, in exchange for beaver pelts and native people to be sold into slavery. One of the first groups to set up such agreements was the Westos, or Richehecrians, who originally came from the north into Virginia and are said to be descendants of the Erie. After an attempt to end the agreements the Savannah people filled the role previously held by the Westos; and eventually the role fell to the Yamasee and the Creek.

The captured Native Americans were brought to the Carolina colony to be sold, and were often then resold to the Caribbean, where they would be less likely to escape, or were resold to one of the other thirteen British colonies of North America. This trade of slaves was not a very self-sustaining venture. Either the native population was being wiped out and those who were not being killed or captured became the captors; and as the population of natives available for capture dwindled then the captors began to fall into debt with the colonists whom they were trading with. This debt and frustration that began the Yamasee War of 1715, which would ultimately be one of the factors that lead to the demise of the trade system in the Carolinas.

== Slavery in the Southeastern colonies ==
British colonists in the colonies of Virginia, Carolina, and Georgia imported enslaved indigenous peoples as workers during the 17th and early 18th centuries. The Carolina colony became a major exporter of enslaved Native Americans to other colonies, including those of New England and the Caribbean. The southern colonies were known for their use of slavery to keep their large plantation economy running. It is usually assumed that all of the slaves were from Africa, but Native Americans were also frequently enslaved, and in some cases were used more than African slaves.

The Native American slave trade in the colonial Southeast was brought to its peak with the use of the European weapons as well as the trade by natives of natives in exchange for more ammunition for weapons as well as other European goods. However, the involvement of the Natives in the slavery of other Natives was not a model that would be able to sustain itself for a long time, and the depletion of 'resources'—Native Americans in this sense being the resources—coupled with Native American revolts including the Yamasee War of 1715 would effectively become one of the factors that led to Native Americans no longer being the primary race enslaved in the colonial southeast.

=== Slavery in the Carolinas ===
Trade between Carolina colonists and native peoples was the core feature of the Carolina Colony from its founding in 1670 to the early 1700s. European colonists offered weapons, alcohol, and manufactured goods in exchange for animal skins and Indian slaves. Charles Town (later Charleston, South Carolina) became a major port for exporting enslaved Indians. The profits from this trade system allowed for the Carolina colony to set up its plantations which mainly produced rice and indigo, and bringing with it the African slaves who would then work the plantations.

Historian Peter H. Wood found that by 1708 South Carolina's population totaled 9,580, including 4,100 African slaves and 1,400 Native American slaves. African men composed 45% of the slave population while Native American women composed 15% of the population of adult slaves in colonial South Carolina. Moreover, the Native American female populations outnumbered the Native American male population, and the African male population greatly outnumbered the African female population. This imbalance encouraged unions between the two racial groups with many former slaves mentioning a notable Native American relative one or two generations before them. The unions also lead to an obvious but unknown number of mixed children of African and Indigenous bloodlines. By 1715 the Native American slave population in the Carolina colony was estimated at 1,850. Prior to 1720, when it ended the Native American slave trade, Carolina exported as many or more Native American slaves than it imported Africans.

This trade system involved the Westo tribe, who had previously come down from further north. The Westos were given goods from Europe in exchange for beaver and other animal pelt and capturing natives to be sold into slavery. Colonial traders encouraged their Indian trading partners to engage in warfare and accumulate captives; they lent their backing to the Stono War of 1674 and the Westo War of 1680. The Goose Creek Men, a small number of planters who moved from Barbados to the Carolina colony, benefited from this trade and offered large quantities of weapons to the Westo, Savannah, Yamasee, and "Settlement Indians" to facilitate it. Colonists and their Yamasee allies went to war with the Tuscarora in 1712, defeating them and capturing hundreds as slaves.

In the first decade of the 18th century, French traders living with the Kaskaskia Illinois, and Miami peoples worked incited warfare to procure slaves for the Carolina market, as well as for sale in New France.

Slavery, especially of Native Americans, was allowed in the legislative framework of the colony with the creation of "Slave Codes" soon after the creation of the colony. As slaves, the natives were expected to hunt while the black slaves worked the plantations. As trade with the Native Americans continued, so did the slavery of Native Americans; however, due to a growing trade monopoly in the colony, some of the colonists, such as Henry Woodward, were trying to limit the amount of trade done with the natives. However, Queen Anne's War (1702–1713) interrupted the building campaigns against trading and allowed for increased sales of slaves in Charleston. Escape was relatively easy for the Native Americans, as they knew the land well and often were not far from their own people. The slave owners' solution to the problem of escaped native slaves was to send them to work in the West Indies, or to another thirteenth colony where they would not be able to escape easily.

However, the Yamasee War, which began in 1715, eventually ended the colony's purchase of Native Americans as slaves, making the colony more reliant upon the labor of black slaves.

=== Slavery in colonial Georgia ===
The colony of Georgia was established in 1732, and its founder James Oglethorpe ensured that slavery was prohibited in the colony. However, the 1735 law which prohibited slavery only disallowed the enslavement of Africans, and not Native Americans. Some of the first of the Native American slaves in Georgia were those brought down with the Musgrove family of South Carolina. Historian Rodney Baine found that reports of purchases of Native American slaves continued in 1738, and that Indian slaves continued to work Georgia plantations in 1772.

=== Slavery in Florida ===
The Florida peninsula was under the control of the Spanish Empire until 1763, when for 20 years it was a British colony, the Spanish taking over again in 1783. Prior to the British Florida interval, there was a period in the early 1700s during which Spanish Florida was a hotbed for the raiding natives from the northern Carolina and Georgia areas. Though they were left alone for the most part by one of the original raiding groups, the Westos—who are said to be descendants of the Erie People, Spanish Florida was heavily targeted by the later raiding groups the Yamasee and Creek. These raids in which villages were destroyed and natives captured or killed drove the natives to the hands of the Spaniards, who protected them as best they could. However, the strength of the Spanish dwindled and as the raids continued, the Spanish and the natives were forced to retreat further down the peninsula. The raids were so frequent that there were barely any natives left to capture, and so the Yamasee and Creek began bringing fewer slaves to the Carolina colonies to continue the trade. The retreat of the Spaniards only ended when the Yamasee and Creek entered what would later be known as the Yamasee War with the Carolina Colony.

== See also ==
- Indentured servitude in the Americas
  - Indentured servitude in Pennsylvania
  - Indentured servitude in Virginia
- Mississippian shatter zone
- Slavery in the colonial United States
