= Emigrant Aid Societies =

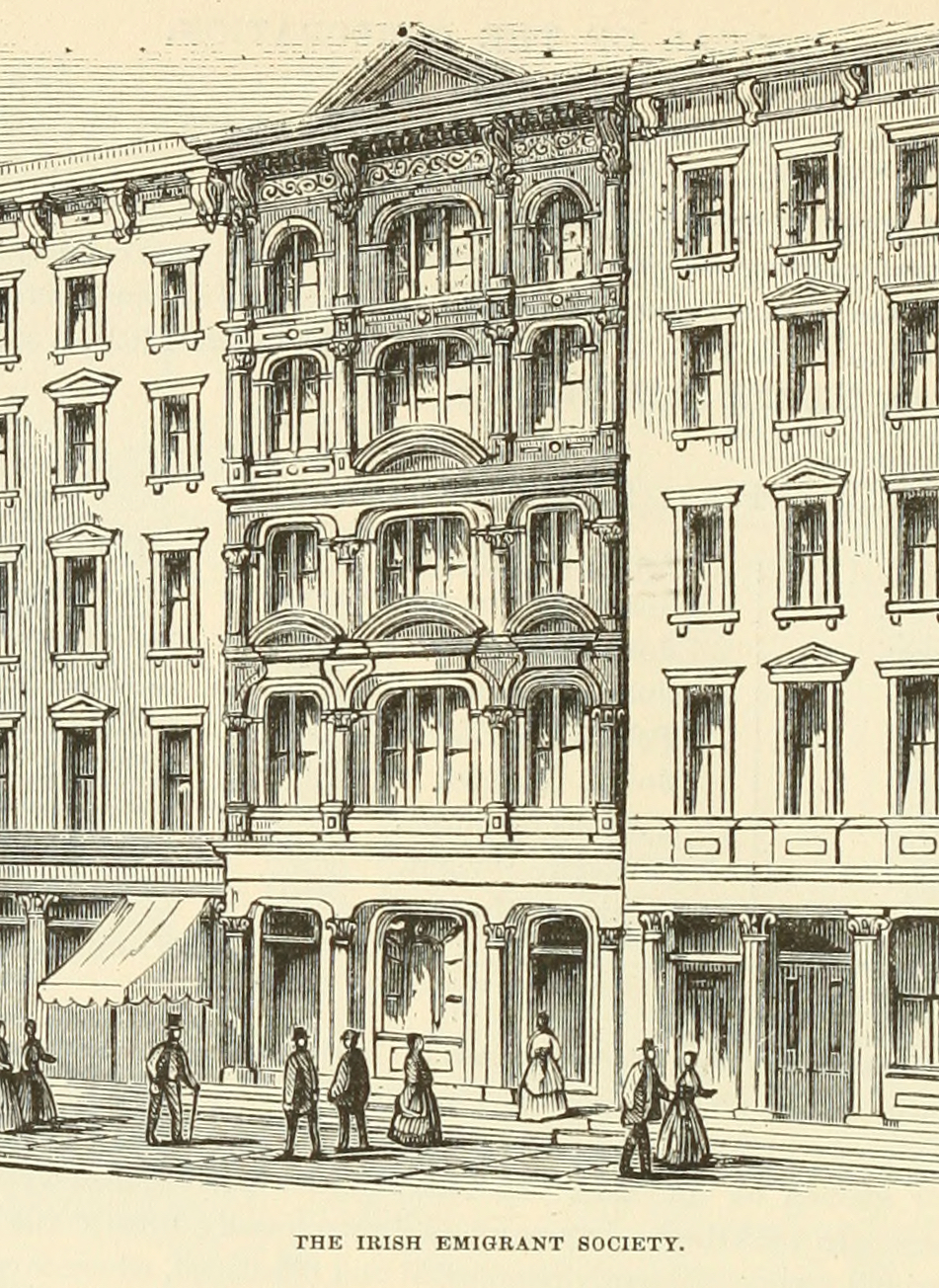

An Emigrant Aid Society was a charitable organisation that helped immigrants, usually of a particular nationality. They were particularly active in the United States.

Examples include:

- The New England Emigrant Aid Company
- The Friendly Sons of St. Patrick
- The Hibernian Society for the Relief of Emigrants from Ireland
- Charitable Irish Society of Boston
- The Irish Emigrant Society of New York
