= Nationality law in the American Colonies =

Nationality law in the American colonies preceding the Articles of Confederation was a decentralized early attempt to develop the concept of citizenship among colonial settlers with respect to the major colonial powers of the period. Precedent was largely based on English common law, with jurisdictional discretion afforded to each of the colonies in accordance with the principles of self-governance.

== Jurisdictional tension between Great Britain and the colonies ==
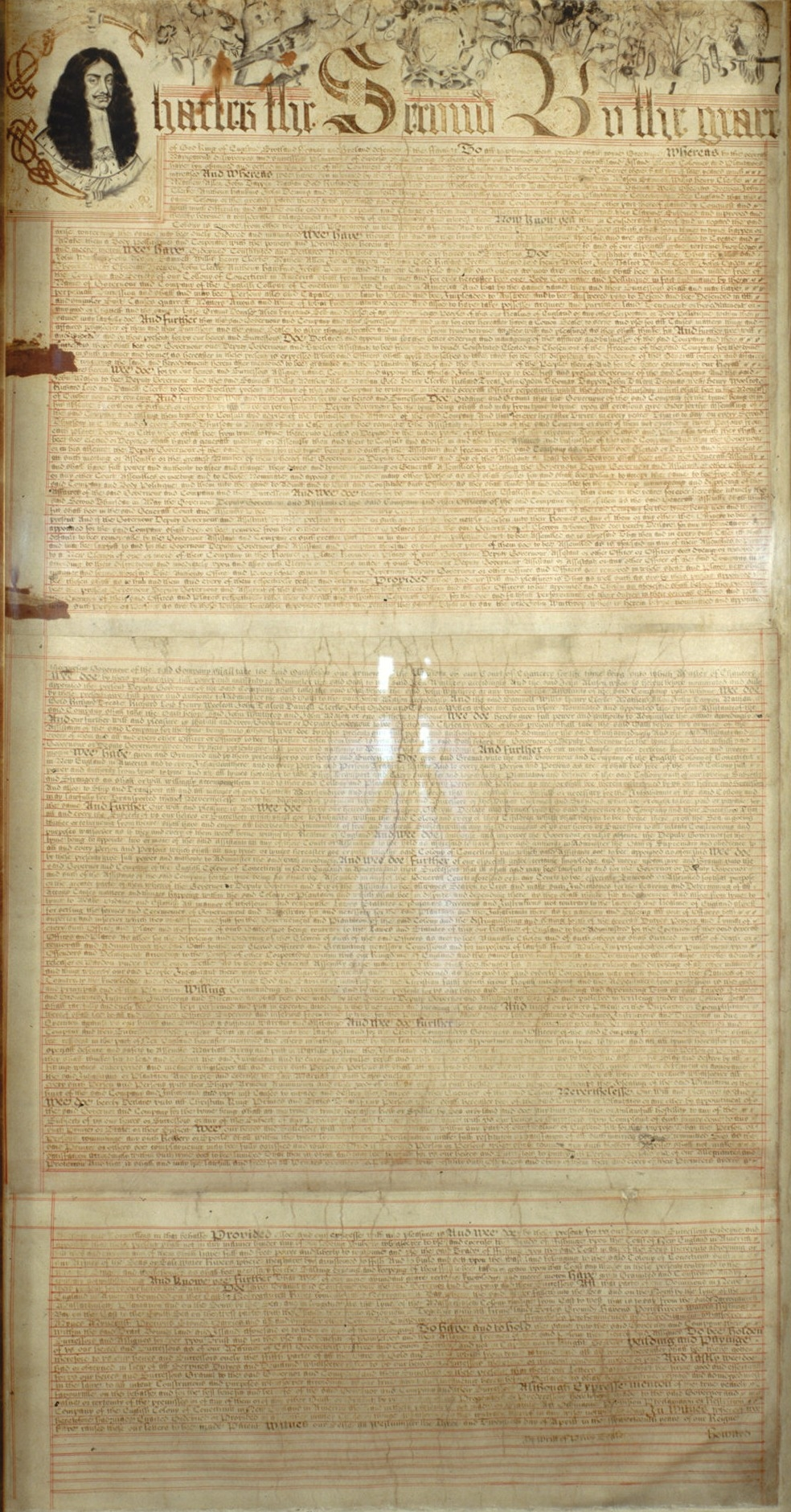
The Royal Charter of Connecticut, 1662.

English common law, under principles of jus sanguinis, viewed English people and their children in the colonies as full subjects of the king. English common law was less clear on the status of alien residents in the colonies, who generally faced a difficult naturalization process to obtain the same legal rights inhered to natural-born English and their descendants. Issues in early naturalization policy stemmed from the legal relationships between Great Britain and its colonies. The strongest legal bonds between Great Britain and the American colonies lay in the colonial charters, many of which professed alien residents in the colonies would eventually become “Our Loving subjects and live under Our Allegiance.” Ambiguity in the colonial charters created uncertainty as to whether the authority to naturalize alien residents resided within the colonies themselves or emanated directly from Parliament in London. Legislative bodies from both locations ultimately issued separate and sometimes conflicting naturalization laws, the interaction of which influenced early patterns of non-English immigration to the American colonies.

== Parliamentary naturalization laws ==
Private naturalization before Parliament afforded the highest legal status an alien resident could obtain in the colonies. However, it was an expensive process, costing applicants upwards of 50 pounds during the 1670s (equivalent to £9,626 in 2025). Further, it was exclusive, in that embedded sacramental tests were designed to bar Catholics from subjectship, yet restricted other non-Christians from the benefits of parliamentary naturalization as well. Alternatively, aliens could seek royal denization, which was a more accessible path to permanent residency yet conferred a lesser form of citizenship than private naturalization.

Religious prejudice, xenophobia and fears of foreign political views, as well as maintenance of an Englishman's superior commercial privileges, all contributed to a conservative approach to early naturalization law. Moreover, Parliament granted these privileges based on individual merit rather than on broader statutory decrees to maintain full control over admissions to the colonies. However, with the passage of the Linen Cloth Act 1663 (15 Cha. 2, c. 15), the difficulties of naturalization started to be modified toward favoring categories of aliens who might prove of particular benefit to the state.

The first general naturalization law, providing a simple administrative process for obtaining naturalization appeared when Parliament passed the Foreign Protestants Naturalization Act 1708 The act required declarations of allegiance and supremacy from aliens and, similar to the private naturalization process, imposed sacramental tests to restrict non-Protestant applicants. One key innovation of the statute was to drastically reduce the application fee to just one shilling. Tory opposition to liberal immigration policies led to the act's eventual repeal in 1712, though the repeal did not invalidate naturalizations that had already been granted.

In light of the Tory position, Parliament faced growing pressure from the colonies to open immigration to fulfill its major need, agrarian labor. During the colonial period, many were interested in promoting immigration, including the Crown, proprietors, colonial governments, landowners, and agents, all saw in it a profitable enterprise, since immigration would promote settlement, increase the value of landed holdings, and create a protective barrier for the colonies against Spanish, French, and Indians. Each interested party promoted immigration in their own way. Colonial assemblies soon became active in this work, and remained so throughout the colonial period. In 1740 Parliament responded with a more liberal and enlightened policy that greatly eased and broadened the ability of aliens in the American colonies to become naturalized subjects of Britain.

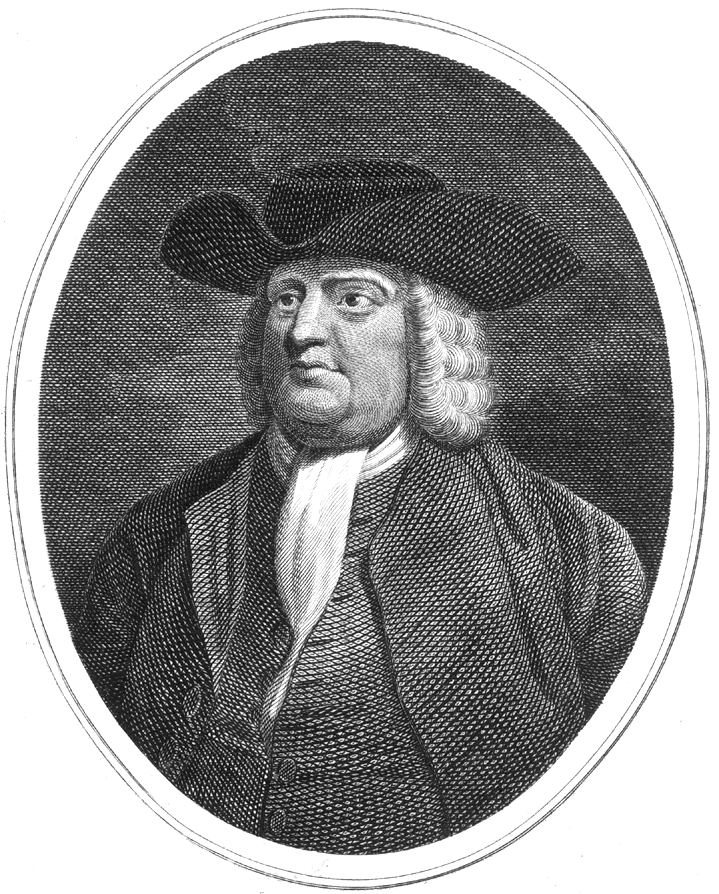
William Penn, who as early as 1700 argued in favor of a general naturalization act for the American colonies

The Plantation Act 1740 supplanted the private naturalization process in which aliens in the colonies had to travel to London to appeal for subjectship on a costly, case-by-case basis. After 1740, aliens could locally apply for naturalization within the colonies so long as they had resided there for seven years or more, without being absent more than two consecutive months. Further, the Act encompassed all of British America, as opposed to the previous policy of only conferring subjectship within the colony from which it was requested. The Act also capped the application cost at two shillings, and required applicants to take an oath of allegiance to the Crown and profess their Protestant belief in open court.

The religious elements of the 1740 Act still favored Protestant applicants at the expense of Catholic applicants, yet new exemptions for Quakers, Jews and, later, Moravians left room for certain non-Protestants to become naturalized subjects of Great Britain. Though localized opposition to Jewish applicants occurred following the 1740 law, competition for new settlers among the colonies prevented their total exclusion from the naturalization process, as alien residents could travel to more permissive colonies to apply for subjectship. For example, Rhode Island, New York and Georgia each made it a deliberate and established part of their public policy to grant such rights to Jewish applicants, and became the colonies where Jews settled in the largest numbers.

Though the Plantation Act imposed stiff fines for non-compliance, the colonies administered the 1740 Act with varying degrees of faithfulness; despite the fines, only six Secretaries of the thirteen American Colonies (and one in the West Indies) submitted the mandated lists. Further, many colonies issued their own naturalization policies to rival those of Parliament, until that practice was prohibited in 1773; that year, Parliament issued instructions to all governors in the colonies not to consent to any naturalization bill passed by a colonial legislative body. As of 1773, at least 6,911 aliens had been naturalized under the 1740 Act, the vast majority of them having done so through Pennsylvania.

== Colonial naturalization laws ==
All colonies, except New Hampshire, developed their own naturalization policies outside of English law. These powers were presumed, as the royal colonial charters did not explicitly grant them, and in many instances was an expression of the public will through provincial legislation. For example, naturalizations of specifically named groups of persons through private acts were a common colonial practice until 1700, after which time Parliament started to restrict local powers over the denization and naturalization of aliens. Under the Act of Settlement 1701, Britain barred naturalized subjects from entering high political office. Nonetheless, some colonies continued to permit this practice based on existing precedent, and as it was unclear whether the parliamentary ban extended to the American colonies. Even under the threat of parliamentary challenge, the colonies persisted in drafting local laws to fulfill their growing demand for new immigrants until those powers were completely proscribed in 1773. Most colonies employed similar methods of naturalization that Great Britain employed. However, colonial legislation was more limited than that of Parliament, in that a colony could not create rights that extended beyond its own borders.

Colonial naturalization policies varied by region. In New England, conservative naturalization policies kept that part of the country more English than other parts of the colonies would later become. For example, in the early 1700s, Massachusetts required any ship entering its ports to provide a passenger list, and later prohibited the importation of poor, infirm or vicious people. Connecticut took to demanding an oath of allegiance from all strangers spending time within its borders. New Hampshire was the only colony that refrained from legislating on the naturalization issue altogether, though there is record that some aliens did settle there and may have been locally accepted as fellow subjects.

Conversely, the mid-Atlantic and southern colonies quickly adopted more permissive naturalization policies. In Virginia, early naturalization laws included a preamble that extolled the advantage of inviting other persons to reside in the colony. South Carolina attracted alien applicants through naturalization laws that granted them the rights of natural-born Englishmen while prohibiting the collection of monies for debts contracted prior to the applicant coming to the colony. Though the creditor class derided the policy, it made South Carolina a refuge for persons who had suffered under austere English debtor laws. New York in 1730 adopted a more accommodating naturalization process as the number of foreign Protestants within its borders reached a point of political importance and the colony sought to fulfill its ambitions of westward expansion. Pennsylvania in 1742 provided its own general law for naturalization that gave full rights to aliens who had resided in the colony for less than the seven years required in the Plantation Act 1740. Parliament later invalidated Pennsylvania's general naturalization law, after which the state, motivated by similar expansionary aims as New York, turned to extensive use of private acts to accomplish its naturalizations. Further, New York and Pennsylvania both exempted persons with conscientious scruples against oaths, which included Quakers, from the requirement to swear allegiance during naturalization, a colonial innovation that would later influence Parliament's general naturalization law.

Though colonial naturalization laws differed in the political rights each bestowed to alien residents, they did generally confer the right to obtain land, which afforded each man the power to obtain the necessary voting qualifications for himself or, at the very least, for his heirs born in the American colonies.

== Post-colonial, pre-constitutional period ==
Leading up to the break from Britain, debates over property and political rights exposed a growing belief in the colonies that alien residents who committed their efforts and resources to the common good justly deserved an equal share of the rights of membership to the community. The American colonists were generally in favor of foreign immigrants, as their contributions to the welfare of the colonies were clear and highly valued. Such circumstances of life in the colonies allowed Americans to examine more closely the concept of allegiance, which played into the emerging belief in the equality of rights regardless of their origin. The Declaration of Independence generally alluded to this concept in its charge that King George III ". . . has endeavoured to prevent the population of these States; for that purpose obstructing the Laws for the Naturalization of Foreigners . . ."

Following the American Revolution, under the Articles of Confederation each colony could independently pass its own naturalization laws, yet each state's authority to naturalize alien residents conferred the same rights of citizenship within the colonies under the principle of comity. As a result, the new American states produced naturalization laws of varying procedures and requirements. Common among them, however, were certain assumptions, including affirming allegiance to an authority and a mandatory period of physical residence prior to obtaining the right of citizenship.

Ultimately, the United States Constitution, which did not address naturalization head on but intended to right the general lack of legal uniformity seen under the Articles of Confederation, empowered Congress to establish a “uniform rule of naturalization” within Article I, section 8, clause 4, permitting the development of United States nationality law at the federal level.
